This is a list of sports announcers and sports commentators. Those television and radio networks included must have national exposure, not regional.

American football
 Troy Aikman – Fox 2001–2021, ESPN 2022–present
 Kenny Albert – Fox 1994–present
 Jason Bell – BBC Sport 2015–2022, ITV Sport 2022–,
 Chris Berman – ESPN 1985–present
 Allen Bestwick – ESPN 2014–present
 Rocky Boiman – BBC Radio 5 Live 2012–13 & 2015–2017, Absolute Radio 2013–2014
 Terry Bradshaw – CBS 1984–1994, Fox 1994–present
 Greg Brady – BBC Radio 5 Live 2006–13, Talksport 2017–present
 Tim Brant – ABC 1982–present
 James Brown – Fox 1994–2006, CBS 2006–present, Showtime 2008–present
 Jack Buck – CBS 1964–96
 Joe Buck – Fox 1994–97, 2001–2021, ESPN 2022–present
 Mike Carlson – Channel 5 1997–2009, BBC Sport 2009–13 & 2015–2022, Channel 4 2010–2015, Talksport 2017–present
 Mark Chapman – BBC Sport 2012–13 & 2015–2021
 Cris Collinsworth – HBO 1989–2008, NBC 1990–98, NBC 2006–present, Fox 1998–2006, NFL Network 2006–08, Showtime 2008–present
 Nat Coombs – Channel 5 2006–2009, Channel 4 2012–15, BBC Sport 2015–2022, Talksport 2017–present
 Lee Corso – ESPN 1987–present
 Howard Cosell – ESPN/ABC 1970–1983
 David Croft – BBC Radio 5 Live 2007
 Randy Cross – CBS 1989–1993, 1998–present, NBC 1994–97
 Al DeRogatis – NBC 1966–1975
 Dan Dierdorf – CBS 1985–1986, 1999–2014, ABC 1987–1999
 Tony Dungy – NBC 2009–present
 Dick Enberg – NBC 1975–1999, CBS 2000–09
 Boomer Esiason – ESPN/ABC 1998–2000, Fox Sports Net 2001, CBS 2002–present
 Darren Fletcher – BBC Radio 5 Live 2011–13 & 2015–present, Absolute Radio 2013–2014, BBC Sport 2012–13, ITV Sport 2022-present
 Dan Fouts – CBS 1988–1993, 2008–present, ESPN/ABC 1997–2008
 Chris Fowler – ESPN/ABC, ESPN/ABC, ABC 1986–present
 Frank Gifford – CBS 1965–70, ABC 1971–99
 Jerry Glanville – Fox 1994–98, CBS 1999–2003
 Curt Gowdy – ABC 1960–1964, 1982–1983, NBC 1965–79
 Jon Gruden – ESPN/ABC 2009–2017
 Kevin Harlan – Fox 1994–97, CBS 1998–present
 Rodney Harrison – NBC 2009–present
 Kirk Herbstreit – ESPN/ABC, ESPN/ABC, ABC 1996–present
 Jake Humphrey – BBC Sport 2008–2011
 Gary Imlach – Channel 4 1987–1997, ITV Sport 2005–2008, Channel 4 2010
 Keith Jackson – ABC 1966–2006
 Ron Jaworski – ESPN/ABC 2007–2011
 Jimmy Johnson – Fox 1994–95, 2002–present
 Daryl Johnston – Fox 2001–present
 Vernon Kay – Channel 4 2013–15
 Danny Kelly – Channel 4 2011
 Howie Long – Fox 1994–present
 Bill Maas – Fox 1995–2005
 John Madden – CBS 1981–1994, Fox 1994–2002, ABC 2002–06, NBC 2006–09
 Paul Maguire – NBC 1976–79, 1988–97, ESPN 1998–2005
 Dan Marino – CBS 2002–present
 Curt Menefee – Fox 2006–present
 Don Meredith – ABC 1970–73, 1977–85, NBC 1974–76
 Al Michaels – ABC 1986–2006, NBC 2006–present
 Matt Millen – CBS 1992–1993, Fox 1994–2001
 Colin Murray – Channel 5 2004–2006, Channel 4 2013–14
 Brent Musburger – CBS 1973–1990, ESPN, ABC 1990–2016
 Jim Nantz – CBS 1985–present
 Merlin Olsen – NBC 1977–1989, CBS 1990–1991
 Mike Patrick – ESPN 1987–present
 Jonathan Pearce – BBC Radio 5 Live 2004
 Matt Roberts – BBC Sport 2009–2013
 Tony Romo – CBS 2017–present
 Sam Rosen – Fox 1996–present
 Ryan Ruocco – ESPN Radio 2013–present
 Shannon Sharpe – CBS 2004–2014
 Phil Simms – ESPN 1994–1995, NBC 1995–1998, CBS 1998–present
 Michael Strahan – Fox 2008–present
 Pat Summerall – CBS 1964–1994, Fox 1994–2002, 2006–2010
 Joe Theismann – ABC 1985, Fox 1986–1987, ESPN 1988–2006, NFL Network 2009–present
 Mike Tirico – ESPN/ABC 2006–2015, NBC 2016–present
 Osi Umeniyoura – BBC Sport 2015–2022, ITV Sport 2022-
 Sean Wheelock – BBC Radio 5 Live 2004–2006
 Arlo White – BBC Radio 5 Live 2005–2010

Association football
 Clive Allen – Sky Sports 1998–2001, ITV Sport 2001–2007, BBC Radio 5 Live 2012–present
 George Allison – BBC Radio 1927–?
 Malcolm Allison – ITV Sport 1970–1974
 Eamonn Andrews – BBC Radio 1950–1962, ITV Sport 1965–1968
 Jimmy Armfield – BBC Radio 1978–2017
 Dean Ashton – BT Sport 2013–present, ITV Sport 2014–present, talksport 2018–present, Quest 2018-2022
 Ron Atkinson – ITV Sport 1980–2004
 John Barnes – ITV Sport 1996–2003, Channel 5 2003–2008, ESPN UK 2010–2013, Al Jazeera/Bein Sports 2013–present, Sky Sports 2020-present
 Wally Barnes – BBC Sport 1956–1975
 David Basheer – SBS 2013–present
 Peter Beagrie – Sky Sports 2006–2017
 James Beattie – BT Sport 2013–2015, BBC Sport 2015
 Dave Beckett – ITV Sport 1997–2008, Channel 5 1997–2012 & 2015–present, ESPN UK 2010–2013, BBC Sport 2009–2015, BT Sport 2014–present
 Jim Beglin – ITV Sport 1996–2013, ESPN UK 2012–2013, RTÉ Sport 2000–present, BT Sport 2013–present, BBC Radio 5 Live 2013–present
 George Best – Sky Sports 1998–2005, TV3 2003–2004
 Manish Bhasin – BBC Sport 2004–present, Premier League TV 2015–present
 Georgie Bingham – Sky Sports 2004–2007, ESPN 2007–2010, Talksport 2010-2020
 Luther Blissett – Channel 4 1996–2002, Bravo 2003–2005
 Packie Bonner – TV3 Ireland 2001–2004
 Ned Boulting – ITV Sport 2001–present
 Steve Bower – talksport 2000–2002, Setanta Sports 2007–2009, ESPN UK 2009–2013, BBC Sport 2009–present, Channel 5 2010, ITV Sport 2011–2012, Premier Sport 2010–2013, BT Sport 2013–present, NBC 2014–present, Channel 4 2017
 Peter Brackley – BBC Radio 1979–1982, ITV Sport 1982–1988, 1992–2002, 2006, Sky Sports 1989–1992, Eurosport 1988–1991, 2002–2005 Channel 4 1992–2002, Bravo 2005–2006, BBC Sport 2009–2011
 Liam Brady – BBC Sport 1990–1994, RTÉ Sport 1998–2008 & 2010–present
 Alan Brazil – Sky Sports 1996–2001, talkSport 2000–present
 Mark Bright – BBC Sport/BBC Radio 5 Live 1999–2013, Eurosport 2013, Absolute Radio 2013–2016
 Trevor Brooking – BBC Sport/BBC Radio 1984–2003
 Simon Brotherton – BBC Radio 5 Live 1993–present, BBC Sport 1999–present, BT Sport 2013–present
 Craig Burley – Setanta Sports 2007–2009, ESPN 2009–2013, BBC Radio 5 Live 2009–present, ITV Sport 2010–2012
 Terry Butcher – BBC Radio 5 Live 1996–2010
 Bryon Butler – BBC Radio c. 1960–1968 as reporter; 1968–1991 as correspondent and commentator; 1991–1997 as reporter
 Tim Caple – Eurosport 1996–present
 Clarke Carlisle – ITV Sport 2013–2014, Absolute Radio 2013–2016
 Shaiju Damodaran – Star Sports 2014–present, Sony Ten 2018
 Jamie Carragher – ITV Sport 2012, Sky Sports 2013–present
 Tony Cascarino – talkSport 2002–2007, TV3 Ireland 2009–present
 Kelly Cates – talkSport 2006–2008, Setanta Sports 2007–2009, ESPN UK 2009–2013, ITV Sport 2010–2013, BBC Radio 5 Live 2013–present, Channel 5 2015–2016, Sky Sports 2016–present
 Ed Chamberlin – Sky Sports 2000–2016
 Jon Champion – BBC Radio 1990–1996, BBC Sport 1995–2001 & 2013–2015, ITV Sport 2001–2010 & 2012–2018, Setanta Sports 2007–2009, ESPN UK 2009–2013, Absolute Radio 2014–2016, BT Sport 2015–2018, ESPN US/ABC 2014–present
 Mark Chapman – BBC Radio 5 Live 2003–present, Channel 5 2007–2009, ESPN UK 2009–2013, BBC Sport 2009–present, Sky Sports 2022-present
 Jack Charlton – ITV Sport 1973–1982, 1992–1996, Channel 5 1999–2001
 Adrian Chiles – BBC Radio 5 Live 2001–2006, BBC Sport 2004–2010, ITV Sport 2010–2014
 Steve Claridge – BBC Radio 5 Live 2000–present, Setanta Sports 2007–2009, BBC Sport 2009–present
 Alan Clarke – BBC Radio c. 1946–1969
 Gabriel Clarke – ITV Sport 1991–present, Channel 4 2003–2005
 Mark Clemmit – BBC Radio 5 Live 2004–2009, BBC Sport 2009–present, BT Sport 2013–present
 Brian Clough – ITV Sport 1973–1974, 1978–1988
 Joe Cole - ITV Sport, Sky Sports, 2018, BT Sport 2019–present
 Chris Coleman – ITV Sport 2010, Sky Sports 2010–2011
 David Coleman – BBC Sport 1958–1982 (stayed with BBC until 2000 but didn't do football)
 Peter Collins – RTÉ Sport 1990–present
 Stan Collymore – BBC Radio 5 Live, 2003–2004, 2007–2008 & 2016, talkSPORT 2008–2016, Channel 5 2008–2012, British Eurosport 2013, Fox Sports 2014, BT Sport 2014–2015
 Nat Coombs – ESPN UK 2010–2013, Talksport 2013–present
 Aidan Cooney – TV3 Ireland 1998–2004
 Matt Cooper – TV3 Ireland 2008–2011
 Stephen Craigan – ESPN UK 2011–2013, BT Sport 2013–present, Sky Sports 2011–2013 & 2015-2022 
 Pat Crerand – ITV Sport 1970, MUTV 2000–present
 Ian Crocker – Sky Sports 1992–2006 & 2009–present, Setanta Sports 2006–2009, ITV Sport 2009–2010
 Garth Crooks – BBC Sport 1982–2022
 Peter Crouch - BT Sport 2019–present, BBC Sport 2019–present
 Jason Cundy – Talksport 2004–present, Sky Sports 2008–2010
 Kenny Cunningham – RTÉ Sport 2008–present, Sky Sports 2010–present
 Darrell Currie – ESPN UK 2009–2013, BT Sport 2013–present
 Ian Darke – BBC Radio 1983–1992, Sky Sports 1992–2010, ESPN/ABC 2010–present, BT Sport 2013–present
 Barry Davies – BBC Radio 1963–1966, ITV Sport 1966–1969, BBC Sport 1969–2004 & 2014, Absolute Radio 2015
 Kevin Davies – BT Sport 2013–present
 Jim Delahunt – Setanta Sports 2006–2009, ESPN UK 2010–2013
 Paul Dempsey – Sky Sports 1989–2006, Setanta Sports 2006–present, BT Sport 2013–present
 Ian Dennis – BBC Radio 5 Live 2002–present, BBC Sport 2013–present
 Marcel Desailly – BBC 2006–2008, Canal+ 2006, ITV Sport 2010–2012
 Lee Dixon – BBC Sport 2004–2012, BBC Radio 5 Live 2004–2012, ITV Sport 2012–present, NBC Sport 2013–present
 Tony Dorigo – ITV Sport 2001–2003, Bravo 2003–2005, Setanta Sports 2006–2007, Channel 5 2007–2008, ESPN UK 2010–2013, Absolute Radio 2010–2016
 Derek Dougan – ITV Sport 1970–1974
 Iain Dowie – BBC Sport 2006–2008, ITV Sport 2008–2009 & 2015–present, Sky Sports 2009–present
 Craig Doyle – ITV Sport 2008–2010
 Peter Drury – BBC Radio 5 Live 1993–1998 & 2013–present, ITV Sport 1998–2013, ESPN UK 2012–2013, BBC Sport 2012–2015, BT Sport 2013–present, Bein Sport 2015–present, NBC Sport 2015–present
 Dion Dublin – Sky Sports 2008–2011, BBC Sport 2011–present, BBC Radio 5 Live 2011–present
 Eamonn Dunphy – RTÉ Sport 1978–2018
 Adrian Durham – talkSport 1999–present, Setanta Sports 2007
 Robbie Earle – ITV Sport 2001–2010, NBC 2013–present
 Maurice Edelston – BBC Radio 1957–1976
 Efan Ekoku – ESPN UK 2010, ITV Sport 2013, BBC Sport 2002 & 2013
 Les Ferdinand – Setanta Sports 2007–2009, BBC Sport 2007–2015, ITV Sport 2012–2015
 Alex Ferguson – ITV Sport 1996–1998
 Martin Fisher – BBC Sport 2004–present, Setanta Sports 2006–2009, ITV Sport 2014
 Darren Fletcher – BBC Radio 5 Live 2005–present, BBC Sport 2010–2013, BT Sport 2013–present
 Robbie Fowler – BBC Sport 2012–present, ITV Sport 2014–present
 Trevor Francis – ITV Sport 1989–1995, Sky Sports 1995–2010, 2013, BT Sport 2015–present
 Kevin Gallacher – Channel 5 2005–2007, Setanta Sports 2006–2009, ITV Sport 2009–2010, ESPN UK 2010–2013, BT Sport 2013–present
 Johnny Giles – RTÉ Sport 1986–2016
 Milena Gimón – DirecTV Sports
 David Ginola – BBC Sport 1998, BT Sport 2013–present, Talksport 2013–present
 Raymond Glendenning – BBC Radio late 1939–1964
 Andy Goldstein – UKTV G2 2006, Talksport 2008–present
 James Alexander Gordon – BBC Radio 1974–2013
 Charlotte Green – BBC Radio 2013–present
 Tim Gudgin – BBC Sport 1995–2011
 Bobby Gould – Talksport 2010–present, BBC Radio 5 Live 2009–2010, BT Sport 2013
 George Graham – Prem Plus 2001–2007
 Andy Gray – Sky Sports 1990–2011, talkSPORT 2011–present, Al Jazeera/Bein Sports 2012–present, BT Sport 2014
 Michael Gray – BBC Radio 5 Live 2010–2011, Talksport 2011–present, BBC Sport 2012–present, Sky Sports 2013
 Jimmy Greaves – ITV Sport 1981–1995, Setanta Sports 2009
 Alan Green – BBC Radio 1982–present, BBC Sport 2013–2017
 Perry Groves – BBC Radio 5 Live 2009–2013, Absolute Radio 2010–2016, talksport 2009 & 2013–present
 Tony Gubba – BBC Sport 1972–2012
 Ruud Gullit – BBC Sport 1996 & 2014–present, ITV Sport 1998–2006, Sky Sports 2007–2014, Bein Sport 2014–present
 Nick Halling – Channel 5 2003–2005, ITV Sport 2005–2008, BBC Sport 2009–2011
 Mark Halsey – BT Sport 2013, Al Jazeera/Bein Sports 2014
 Didi Hamann – RTÉ Sport 2010–present, Talksport 2013–present, Sky Sports 2012–2015, BBC Sport 2014–present
 George Hamilton – BBC Sport 1970–1978, RTÉ Sport 1978–present
 Alan Hansen – Sky Sports 1991–1992, BBC Sport 1992–2014
 Owen Hargreaves – BT Sport 2013–present
 Gerry Harrison – ITV Sport (mainly Anglia Television) 1970–1993
 John Hartson – Setanta Sports 2008–2009, ESPN UK 2010–2013, BBC Radio 5 Live 2010–present, BBC Sport 2013–present, BT Sport 2015–present, Sky Sports 2018-present
 Rob Hawthorne – BBC Radio 5 Live 1990–1995, Sky Sports 1995–present
 Adrian Healey – ESPN/ABC 2003–present, NBC Sports 2008
 John Helm – BBC Radio 1975–1981, ITV Sport 1981–2001, Channel 5 1999–2007, Al Jazeera 2007–present
 Thierry Henry – BBC Sport 2014 & 2016, BBC Radio 5 Live 2016, Sky Sports 2014 & 2015–2018
 Jimmy Hill – ITV Sport 1968–1973, BBC Sport 1973–1998, Sky Sports 1999–2007
 Simon Hill – SBS 2001–2006 Fox Sports 2006–present
 Glenn Hoddle – Sky Sports 2007–2015, ITV Sport 1996, 1998, 2000, 2014–present, BT Sport 2015–present
 Roy Hodgson – BBC Sport 2010 & 2015
 Matt Holland – BBC Radio 5 Live 2006, RTÉ Sport 2010, BBC Sport 2011–present, Sky Sports 2010–2011, ESPN UK 2010–2011, Talksport 2011–present
 Ray Houghton – talkSport 2001–present, RTÉ Sport 2001–present, Channel 5 2002–2004, Sky Sports 2010–present
 Don Howe – Channel 4 1993–2002
 Richard Hughes – ESPN UK 2012–2013, BT Sport 2013–present
 Jake Humphrey – BBC Sport 2006–2012, BT Sport 2013–present
 Mike Ingham – BBC Radio 1977–2014
 John Inverdale – BBC Radio 1988–2001, Sky Sports 1990–1991
 David James – BBC Sport 2012, BT Sport 2013–present
 Hugh Johns – ITV Sport 1966–1982
 Roger Johnson – BBC Sport 2004–2010
 Peter Jones – BBC Radio 1966–1990
 Ron Jones – BBC Radio 1983–2004 (latterly also for Today FM in Ireland)
 Tony Jones – Sky Sports 2002–present, ITV Sport 2005–2008, Channel 5 2005–2007, Channel 4 2012, BBC Sport 2014
 Chris Kamara – Sky Sports 1996–present
 Roy Keane – Sky Sports 2009, ITV Sport 2011–present, BBC Sport 2015
 Kevin Keegan – ITV Sport 1991–1998, ESPN UK 2009–2013
 Des Kelly – Talksport 2011–present, BT Sport 2013–present
 Brian Kerr – RTÉ Sport 1992–present, TV3 Ireland 2011–present
 Martin Keown – BBC Sport 2005–present, BBC Radio 5 Live 2005–present, TV3 Ireland 2008–2014, ESPN UK 2009–2013, BT Sport 2015–present
 Richard Keys – Sky Sports 1990–2011, talkSPORT 2011–present, Al Jazeera/Bein Sports 2012–present
 Kevin Kilbane – RTÉ Sport 2010, BBC Radio 5 Live 2012–present, BBC Sport 2013–present, BT Sport 2013–present, TV3 Ireland 2013–present
 Denis Law – ITV Sport 1981–1995
 Mark Lawrenson – BBC Radio 5 Live 1995–present, BBC Sport 1997–present, TV3 Ireland 2000–present
 Graeme Le Saux – BBC Sport 2004–2006 & 2017–present, BBC Radio 5 Live 2004–2006, 2012–present, ITV Sport 2009, NBC Sport 2013–present
 Matt Le Tissier – Sky Sports 2003–2020
 Leonardo – BBC Sport 2006–2010 & 2014, Al Jazeera 2013–present
 Bill Leslie – Channel 5 2002, Sky Sports 2003–present
 Gary Lineker – ITV Sport 1990–1992, BBC Radio 5 Live 1995–1996, BBC Sport 1992–present, Al Jazeera 2007–2013, NBC Sport 2013–present, BT Sport 2015–present
 Graham Little – Setanta Sports 2006–2008, Sky Sports 2008–present
 Gabby Logan – Sky Sports 1996–1998, ITV Sport 1998–2006, BBC Radio 5 Live 2006–2010, BBC Sport 2007–present, Amazon Prime Video 2019-
 Matthew Lorenzo Sky Sports 1989–1992, ITV Sport 1992–1995
 Rebecca Lowe – BBC Sport 2003–2007, Setanta Sports 2007–2009, ESPN UK 2009–2013, NBC 2013–present
 Des Lynam – BBC Radio 1969–1978, 2004–2005, BBC Sport 1979–1999, ITV Sport 1999–2004, Setanta Sports 2007–2009
 Rob MacLean – Setanta Sports 2004–2009, BBC Scotland 2009–present
 Jimmy Magee – RTÉ Radio 1966–1974, RTÉ Sport 1974–2012, Channel 4 1994
 Darragh Maloney – RTÉ Sport 2002–present
 Alistair Mann – ITV Sport 2001–2006, 2014, Channel 5 2004–2005, BBC Sport 2006–present
 Daniel Mann – Sky Sports 2006–present
 Gabriele Marcotti – talkSport 2001–2007, 2011–present, BBC Radio 5 Live 2007–present, Channel 5 2007–2008, ESPN UK 2010–2013, BT Sport 2013–present
 Rodney Marsh – Sky Sports 1994–2005, talkSport 2005–2006, 2013–present
 Alvin Martin – talkSport 1997–present
 Len Martin – BBC Sport 1958–1995
 Kyle Martino – ESPN UK/ESPN US/ABC 2010, Fox 2011, NBC 2012–2014, NBC 2013–present
 Brian Marwood – Sky Sports 1998–2008
 Sam Matterface – Sky Sports 2007–2010, Talksport 2010–present, ITV Sport 2010–present
 Gary McAllister – Sky Sports 2006–2013, BT Sport 2013–2018
 Mick McCarthy – BBC Sport 2004–2013
 Ally McCoist – BBC Sport 1997–1999, ITV Sport 1999–2007 & 2014–present, Setanta Sports 2006–2007, BT Sport 2015–present, BBC Radio 5 Live 2016–2018, talksport 2018–present, Sky Sports 2020-
 Alan McInally – Sky Sports 1998–present
 Frank McLintock – Sky Sports 1998–2007
 Steve McManaman – Setanta Sports 2007–2009, ESPN UK 2010–2014, BT Sport 2013–present, ESPN/ABC 2010–present
 Bob McNab – ITV Sport 1970
 Conor McNamara – RTÉ 1997–1998, TV3 1998–2002 & 2017–present, BBC Radio 5 Live 2002–present, BBC Sport 2004–present
 Paul McVeigh – Talksport 2012–present, Sky Sports 2013–present
 Paul Merson – Sky Sports 2007–present, Talksport 2010
 Danny Mills – BBC Radio 5 Live 2009–present, BBC Sport 2013–present, BT Sport 2015–present
 Scott Minto – Sky Sports 2012–2020
 Jason Mohammad – BBC Sport 2013–present, BBC Radio 5 Live 2016–present
 Brian Moore – BBC Radio 1961–1968, ITV Sport 1968–1998, Talksport 1999–2001
 John Motson – BBC Radio 1968–1971, BBC Sport 1971–2018, BBC Radio 5 Live 2001–2018, talksport 2018-present
 Guy Mowbray – Eurosport 1997–1999, ITV Sport 1999–2004, BBC Sport 2004–present, BBC Radio 5 Live 2013–present, BT Sport 2015–present
 Danny Murphy – Talksport 2013–present, ITV Sport 2010–2011, BBC Sport 2013–present, BBC Radio 5 Live 2013–present
 Colin Murray – Channel 5 2006–2010, 2017–2018, BBC Radio 5 Live 2009–2013 & 2016–present, BBC Sport 2010–2013, talksport 2013–2016, Quest 2018–present
 John Murray – BBC Radio 5 Live 1997–present, BBC Sport 2000, 2011
 Robbie Mustoe – ESPN UK/ESPN/ABC 2008–2013, NBC 2013–present
 John Murray – BBC Radio 5 Live 1997–present, BBC Sport 2000, 2011
 Gary Neville – ITV Sport 2002, 2008 & 2018, Sky Sports 2011–2015 & 2016–present
 Pat Nevin – BBC Radio 5 Live 1997–present, Channel 5 1999–2012, BBC Scotland 2007–present, BBC Sport 2012–present
 Gary Newbon – ITV Sport 1969–2005, talkSport 1995–2005, Sky Sports 2005–present
 Charlie Nicholas – Sky Sports 2001–2020
 Sally Nugent – BBC Sport 2013–present
 Jacqui Oatley – BBC Radio 5 Live 2005–present, BBC Sport 2007–present, ESPN 2012–2013, ITV Sport 2013–present
 Dan O'Hagan – Eurosport 2003–present, BBC Sport 2004–present, ITV Sport 2013–2014
 Bill O'Herlihy – RTÉ Sport 1972–2014
 David O'Leary – BBC Sport 1994–2002, BT Sport 2014
 Martin O'Neill – RTÉ Sport 1990–1994 BBC Sport 1998–2008, ITV Sport 2011–2014
 Paul Osam – TV3 Ireland 2004–2008 
 John O'Shea - Sky Sports 2019-
 Kirsteen O'Sullivan – TV3 Ireland 2010–2012 & 2016, Channel 4 2017
 Jonathan Overend – BBC Radio 5 Live 2013–present
 Michael Owen – BBC Sport 2013–2014, BT Sport 2013–present, Channel 4 2017
 Rob Palmer – ITV (mainly Granada Television) 1992–1995, Sky Sports 1995–present
 Alan Pardew – Sky Sports 2017–
 Paul Parker – Setanta Sports 2007–2009
 Ray Parlour – BBC Radio 5 Live 2008–2009, talkSPORT 2009–present
 Alan Parry – BBC Radio 1973–1982, BBC Sport 1981–1985, ITV Sport 1985–1996, Sky Sports 1996–present, talkSport 1998–2002, 2014 & 2016-present
 Ian Payne – BBC Radio 1988–2003, Sky Sports 2003–2010, BBC Radio 5 Live 2010–present, ITV News 2013–present
 Jonathan Pearce – Sky Sports 1992–1994, Capital Radio 1991–2002, Channel 5 1997–2004, BBC Radio 5 Live 2002–2005, 2013–2014, BBC Sport 2004–present, BT Sport 2013–present
 David Pleat – ITV Sport 1981–1984, 1992–1995, 1998–2009, BBC Sport 1995–1998, BBC Radio 5 Live 1991–1995 & 2005–present
 Mark Pougatch – BBC Radio 5 Live 1998–present, BBC Sport 2004–2006, ITV Sport 2015–present 
 Gus Poyet – ITV Sport 2013–2014, BBC Sport 2013, Al Jazeera 2013–present
 Jim Proudfoot – Sky Sports 1998–2006, 2013–present, talkSport 1999–2010 & 2014–present, Absolute Radio 2010–2014, Setanta Sports 2006–2009, ESPN 2009–2013, ITV Sport 2011–2013, BBC Sport 2010–2012, Bein Sport 2014–present
 Davie Provan – Sky Sports 2003–present
 David Prutton – Sky Sports 2016–present
 Tony Pulis – BT Sport 2013, BBC Radio 5 Live 2013–present, ITV Sport 2013–present
 Micky Quinn – talkSport 2002–present
 Niall Quinn – Sky Sports 2012–2017, Virgin Media Ireland 2018–present
 Derek Rae – ESPN US 2002–2009, ESPN UK 2009–2013, BT Sport 2013–present
 Harry Redknapp – Setanta 2009–2010, BBC Sport 2010, 2012–2013, Talksport 2010–2012, BT Sport 2015–present, TV3 Ireland 2015–2018
 Jamie Redknapp – BBC Sport 2002–2004, Sky Sports 2004–present
 Damien Richardson – TV3 Ireland 2002–2008, RTÉ Sport 2009–present
 James Richardson – Channel 4 1992–2002, Eurosport 2002–2005, Bravo 2005–2006, Setanta Sports 2007–2009, ESPN UK 2009–2013, BBC Sport 1996, 1998, 2012–2013, BT Sport 2013–present
 Steve Rider – BBC Sport 1994–1996, ITV Sport 2006–2010
 Rachel Riley – Sky Sports 2016–2017
 Bobby Robson – ITV Sport 1998–2004
 Stewart Robson – Channel 5 2007–2009, Talksport 2011–present, ESPN UK 2010–2013, BT Sport 2013–present, Eurosport 2014–present, Bein Sports 2013–present, Fox Sports (2015–2018)
 Leroy Rosenior – BBC Sport 2009–2015
 Jim Rosenthal – BBC Radio 1977–1980, ITV Sport 1980–2012,
 Joe Royle – BBC Sport 2002–2004, ESPN UK 2010–2012
 Max Rushden – Sky Sports 2008–present, Talksport 2008 & 2013–2016, BBC Radio 5 Live 2009–2012
 Richie Sadlier – RTÉ Sport 2010–present
 Mark Saggers – BBC Radio 1989–1992, Sky Sports 1992–2001, BBC Radio 5 Live 2001–2009, talkSport 2009–present
 Ian St. John – ITV Sport 1978–1998, Setanta Sports 2009
 Robbie Savage – BBC Radio 5 Live 2009–present, BBC Sport 2010–present, ESPN UK 2010–2013, BT Sport 2014–present
 Peter Schmeichel – BBC Sport 2002–2005, 2012–2014, BBC Radio 5 Live 2002–2005
 Alex Scott (footballer, born 1984) - BBC Sport 2019-, ITV Sport 2021, Sky Sports 2017-2021
 Angus Scott – ITV Sport 2001–2007, Setanta Sports 2007–2009, Al Jazeera/Bein Sports 2010–present
 Steve Scott – Channel 5 1998–2003
 Alan Shearer – Sky Sports 2005–2006,BBC Sport 2006–present, Al Jazeera/Bein Sports 2010–present
 Ben Shepherd – Sky Sports 2009–2019
 Teddy Sheringham – ITV Sport 2009–2010
 Geoff Shreeves – Sky Sports 1999–present
 Gerald Sinstadt – BBC Radio 1963–1968, ITV Sport 1968–1983, BBC Sport 1983–2011
 Alan Smith – Sky Sports 2002–present
 Matt Smith – BBC Sport 1999–2001, ITV Sport 2001–2015, BT Sport 2015–present, Talksport 2015–present
 Sue Smith – BBC Sport 2007–present, Sky Sports 2019-present
 Graeme Souness – Sky Sports 2005–present, RTÉ Sport 2006–2010, Al Jazeera 2010–2013, TV3 Ireland 2015–present
 Gareth Southgate – ITV Sport 2006–2013, BBC Sport 2009
 Jeff Stelling – BBC Radio 1984–1989, ITV Sport 1989–1991, Channel 4 1991–1992, Sky Sports 1992–present
 Gary A. Stevens – talkSport 2003–2008
 Trevor Steven – BBC Sport 1998–2002, RTÉ Sport 2006–2014
 Gordon Strachan BBC Sport 2004–2010, ITV Sport 2010–2014, Sky Sports 2016–present
 John Strong – NBC Sports 2013–2014, FOX Sports 2015–present
 Ray Stubbs – BBC Sport 1990–2009, BBC Radio 5 Live 2006–2008, ESPN UK 2009–2013, BT Sport 2013–2016, talksport 2011–present
 Dean Sturridge – Sky Sports 2003–present
 Gary Taphouse – Sky Sports 2005–present, talksport 2014–present
 Graham Taylor – ITV Sport 1987–1990, 2001–2004, BBC Radio 5 Live 2001–present, Channel 5 2009–2012
 Phil Thompson – Sky Sports 2004–2020
 Steven Thompson – BBC Sport 2020–present
 Simon Thomas – Sky Sports 2010–2019
 Clare Tomlinson – Sky Sports 1998–present
 John Toshack – TV3 Ireland 2001–2004
 Andy Townsend – ITV Sport 2000–2015 & 2016, talkSport 2003–2010, BT Sport 2015, BBC Radio 5 Live 2015–present
 Clive Tyldesley – ITV Sport 1987–1992, 1996–present, BBC Sport 1992–1996
 Martin Tyler – ITV Sport 1976–1990, Sky Sports 1990–present, NBC Sports 2013–present, Fox Sports 2014–2018
 Matthew Upson – ITV Sport 2017, BBC Sport 2016–present
 Terry Venables – BBC Sport 1985–1994, ITV Sport 1994–2006, Setanta Sports 2007–2009
 Barry Venison – Sky Sports 1992–1997, ITV Sport 1997–2004
 Gianluca Vialli – BBC Sport 2012–2023
 Chris Waddle – BBC Sport 1994–1998 & 2014, BBC Radio 5 Live 1998–present, Setanta Sports 2007–2009, ESPN UK 2009–2013
 Andy Walker – Sky Sports 2008–present
 Dan Walker – BBC Sport 2009–present, BBC Radio 5 Live 2013–2016
 Lucy Ward – BBC Sport 2007–present, ITV Sport 2009, ESPN UK 2011–2013, BT Sport 2013–present, Channel 4 2017
 Neil Warnock – Talksport 2010–2011, 2013–2014, BT Sport 2013–2014
 Elton Welsby – ITV Sport 1983–1994
 Mike West – BBC Sport 2011–present
 Ronnie Whelan – TV3 Ireland 2001–2004, RTÉ Sport 2005–present
 Arlo White – BBC Radio 5 Live 2001–2010, NBC Sport 2012–present, ITV Sport 2014, BBC Sport 2017–present
 Faye White – BBC Sport 2012–present
 Ray Wilkins – BBC Sport 1990, ITV Sport 1994, Sky Sports 2011–2013, Talksport 2014–present, BT Sport 2014–present
 Russ Williams – ITV Sport 2001–2004, Absolute 2010–2016, talksport 2007–2009
 Bob Wilson – BBC Sport 1974–1994, ITV Sport 1994–2002
 Steve Wilson – BBC Radio 5 Live 1998–2004, 2013–present, BBC Sport 2000–present, Eleven Sports 2018-present
 Kenneth Wolstenholme – BBC Radio 1946–1948, BBC Sport 1948–1971, ITV Sport 1974–1979, Channel 4 1992–1996
 Dave Woods – BBC Radio 5 Live 1997–present, BBC Sport 2004–2005, 2015, Channel 5 2007–2012
 Laura Woods (English presenter) - Sky Sports, ITV Sport 2021
 Ian Wright – ITV Sport 1998–2000 & 2013–present, BBC Sport 2001–2008 & 2015–present, talkSport 2007–2010, Absolute Radio 2010–2016, BBC Radio 5 Live 2013–present, BT Sport 2014–2017, Channel 4 2017, Sky Sports 2017–present
 Dwight Yorke – Sky Sports 2011–present

Athletics
 Harold Abrahams – BBC Radio 1929–1974
 Steve Backley – BBC Radio 5 Live 2005–present, BBC Sport 2009–2010 & 2014–present
 Sue Barker – BBC Sport 1994–2008
 Roger Black – BBC Sport 1998–2003
 Linford Christie – BBC Sport 1998–2000
 David Coleman – BBC Sport 1958–2000
 Mike Costello – BBC Radio 5 Live 1998–present, BBC Sport 2009–2011 & 2014–present
 Andrew Cotter – BBC Sport 2013–present
 Steve Cram – Eurosport 1995–1999, Channel 4 1997–1999, BBC Sport 1999–present
 Allison Curbishley – BBC Radio 5 Live 2003–present
 Ian Darke – BBC Radio 1985–1990
 Ortis Deley – 3 days for Channel 4 2011 (Sacked after viewer complaints)
 Paul Dickenson – BBC Sport 1987–2014
 Jonathan Edwards – BBC Sport 2003–2016, BBC Radio 5 Live 2013–2016, Channel 4 2012–2016, Eurosport 2017–present
 Rick Edwards – Channel 4 2011–2013
 Brendan Foster – BBC Sport 1983–2017
 Sally Gunnell – Channel 4 1998–1999, BBC Sport 1999–2006
 Tom Hammond – NBC 1992–present
 John Inverdale – BBC Sport 2009–2012
 Hazel Irvine – BBC Sport 1999–2010
 Colin Jackson – BBC Sport 2003–present
 Michael Johnson – BBC Sport 2001–present, Channel 4 2011
 Phil Jones – BBC Sport 2005–present
 Denise Lewis – BBC Sport 2009–present
 Gabby Logan – BBC Sport 2012–present
 Dean Macey – Channel 4 2011–2012, BBC Sport 2010–2013
 Bruce McAvaney – Channel Seven 1980–1983, Channel Ten 1983–1989, Channel Seven 1989–present
 Sonja McLaughlan – BBC Radio 5 Live 1998–present, Channel 4 2012–present
 Katharine Merry – BBC Radio 5 Live 2006–2010, Channel 4 2011–present
 Adrian Metcalfe – ITV 1973–1987
 Dave Moorcroft – BBC Sport 1983–1997
 Steve Ovett – ITV 1985–1997, Channel 4 1997–1998, BBC Sport 2006
 Alan Parry – BBC Radio 1974–1985, ITV Sport 1985–1997, Sky Sports 2001–2007
 Ron Pickering – BBC Sport 1967–1991
 Paula Radcliffe – BBC Sport 2013–present
 John Rawling – BBC Radio 1990–2005, Channel 4 2011–present, BBC Sport 2019–present
 Jim Rosenthal – ITV Sport 1983–1997
 Stuart Storey – BBC Sport 1973–2008, 2010–2017, Setanta Sports 2006–2009 (With BBC for Diamond League World Feed)
 Iwan Thomas – Channel 4 2011–present

Australian rules football
 Malcolm Blight – Network Ten 1995–1997, Seven Network 1997–1998, 2000 Network Ten 2002–2005
 James Brayshaw – Seven Network 1997–2001 and 2018–present, Nine Network 2002–2006
 Dermott Brereton – Seven Network unknown–2001, Nine Network 2002–2011, Foxtel 2012–present
 Wayne Carey – Foxtel 2006–present
 Dennis Cometti – Seven Network 1986–2001, 2007–2016, Nine Network 2002–2006
 Chris Dittmar – Seven Network 1995–present
 Tim Gossage – Network Ten 2002–2011 
 Tom Harley – Seven Network 2012–2014
 Anthony Hudson – Channel Seven 1999–2001, Network Ten 2002–2011, Fox Footy 2012–present
 Craig Hutchison – Channel Seven 1999–2006, Nine Network 2006–present
 Brett Kirk – Channel Seven 2012
 Peter Landy
 Tim Lane – ABC (Aus) 1979–present, Network Ten 2003–2011, Seven Network 2018–present
 Dan Lonergan – ABC (Aus) 1997–present
 Mick Malthouse – Channel 7 2012, 3AW 2012
 Bruce McAvaney – Channel Seven 1980–1983, Channel Ten 1983–1989, Channel Seven 1989–present
 Eddie McGuire – Nine Network 1994–2006, Fox Footy 2012–2022
 Hamish McLachlan – Channel Seven 2012–present
 Glenn Mitchell – ABC (Aus) 1990–present
 Stephen Quartermain – Network Ten 2002–2011
 Michael Roberts – Nine Network 1989–present
 Sandy Roberts – Channel Seven 1980s–2001, Fox Footy 2014–present
 Brian Taylor – Nine Network 2002–06, Fox Footy 2007–11, Channel Seven 2012–present
 Robert Walls – Seven Network 1998–2001, Network Ten 2002–2011, 1116 SEN 2012–present
 Peter Walsh – ABC (Aus) 1978–present
 Basil Zempilas – Channel Seven 2012–2021

Badminton
 Anthony Clark - Sky Sports 2013–present
 Gillian Clark - BBC Sport 1993–present
 Barry Davies - BBC Sport 1977-1995
 Gail Emms - BBC 2009–present
 David Mercer - BBC Sport 1993-2016
 Peter West - BBC Sport 1970-1983

Baseball

 Marv Albert – NBC 1979–1989
 Mel Allen – NBC 1951–1953, 1955–1958, 1960–1963
 Red Barber – CBS 1939–1966
 Bonnie Bernstein – ESPN 2006–present
 Tommy Boyd – Channel 5 1997
 Marty Brennaman – 700 WLW 1974–present
 Thom Brennaman – Fox 1996–present
 Jack Brickhouse – WGN-TV 1948–1981
 Simon Brotherton – BBC Radio 2004–present
 Lorn Brown
 Jack Buck – CBS 1983–1991, KMOX 1954–2001
 Joe Buck – Fox 1996–2021
 Chip Caray – Fox 1996–2000, WGN 1998–2004, TBS 2005–2009
 Harry Caray – WGN 1982–1997
 Skip Caray – TBS 1976–2007, NBC 2000
 Tom Cheek – Toronto Blue Jays, 1977–2004
 Josh Chetwynd – Five 2001–2003, 2006–2008, BBC Radio 2004–2006, 2011–present
 Nat Coombs – BBC Radio 2011–present
 Bob Costas – NBC 1984–2000, MLB Network 2009–present
 Dizzy Dean – ABC 1953–1954, CBS 1955–1965
 Peter Gammons – ESPN 1990–2009, MLB Network 2010–present
 Joe Garagiola – NBC 1961–1964, 1975–1988
 Jonny Gould – Five 1997–2008, BBC Radio 2011–present
 Curt Gowdy – NBC 1966–1975
 Milo Hamilton – Chicago Cubs 1980–84, Houston Astros 1987–2012
 Ernie Harwell – Detroit Tigers 1960–1991, 1993–2002
 Russ Hodges – New York/San Francisco Giants 1949–1970
 Harry Kalas – WPHL 1971–82,1993–98 WTXF 1983–92 CSN 1976–2009
 Michael Kay – YES Network 2002–present
 Ralph Kiner – WWOR–TV 1962–1998 WPIX 1999–2013
 Tony Kubek – NBC 1965–1989
 Steve Lyons – Fox 1996–2006
 Denny Matthews – Fox Sports K.C. 2007–present
 Tim McCarver – ABC 1984–1990, 1994–1996 CBS 1990–1994, Fox 1996–2013
 Sean McDonough – CBS 1990–1999, ESPN 2000–present
 Al Michaels – ABC (US) 1976–1989, 1994–1995
 Jon Miller – NBC 1986–1989, ESPN 1990–2010
 Joe Morgan – ABC (US) 1986–1987, NBC 1994–2000, ESPN 2000–2010
 Bob Murphy – WOR-TV 1962–2003
 Brent Musburger – CBS 1984, ABC 1994–1995
 Lindsey Nelson – NBC 1957–1961, WOR-TV, 1962–1979
 Pee Wee Reese – CBS 1960–1965, NBC 1966–1968
 Harold Reynolds – ESPN 1996–2006, MLB Network 2009–present
 Phil Rizzuto
 Art Rust Jr. – WABC 1980s
 Sam Ryan – ESPN 2004–2006 MLB Network 2011
 Vin Scully – NBC 1955–1956, 1962–1963, 1965–1966, 1983–1989
 Jim Simpson – NBC 1966–1977
 John Smoltz - TBS 2007–2008 & 2010–2013, Fox 2014-present
 John Sterling – WABC 1989–2002, WCBS 2003–present
 Dick Stockton – CBS 1990–1992, Fox 1996–present, TBS 2007–present
 Bob Uecker – Milwaukee Brewers, 1971–present
 Matt Vasgersian – MLB Network, 2009–present

Basketball
 Marv Albert – NBC 1990–1997, 1999–2002 TNT 2002–2021
 John Amaechi – BBC 2008–present
 Charles Barkley – TNT 2000–present
 Bob Blackburn – KOMO 1967–1978, KIRO 1978–1987, KJR 1987–1992
 Mike Breen – NBC (Olympics) 1996, 2000, 2004, 2008, NBC 1997–2002, MSG 1992–present, ESPN/ABC 2003–present
 Hubie Brown – CBS 1987–1990, Turner Sports 1990s–2002, ESPN/ABC 2006–present
 Doris Burke – ESPN/ABC 1991–present
 Kevin Calabro – Seattle SuperSonics 1987–2008, Turner Sports
 Steve Carfino – Network Ten 1992–1995, 2010–2014, Fox Sports 1996–2010
 John Casey – Fox Sports 1995–2010, ABC (Australia) 2010–2015
 Doug Collins – Turner Sports 1989–1995, NBC 1998–2001, TNT 2003–2010
 Eddie Doucette
 Jim Durham – ESPN Radio 1996–present
 Ian Eagle – CBS 1998–present, Fox Sports Net New York/YES Network 1995–present
 Mike Fratello – NBC 1990–1993, TNT 1999–2004, 2007–present
 Walt Frazier – MSG Network 1989–present
 Andrew Gaze – Melbourne United 2010–present
 Mike Gorman – Boston Celtics 1981–present
 Tim Gossage – Network Ten 1992–1997, 2014
 Kevin Harlan – Turner Sports 1996–present
 Chuck Harmon – WWSEN 2006–present
 Shane Heal – Sydney Kings 2010–2014
 Chick Hearn – Los Angeles Lakers 1961–2002
 Tom Heinsohn – CBS 1983–1990, Boston Celtics 1981–2020
 Hot Rod Hundley – CBS 1975–1980, New Orleans/Utah Jazz 1974–2009
 Mark Jackson – ESPN/ABC 2005–2011
 Gus Johnson – CBS 1996–2011, Big Ten Network, 2008–present, Fox 2013–present
 Steve "Snapper" Jones – NBC 1990–2002
 Clark Kellogg – CBS 1993–present
 Steve Kerr – TNT 2003–2007, TNT 2010–2014
 Namugenyi Kiwanuka
 Ralph Lawler – Los Angeles Clippers 1978–present
 Rebecca Lobo – ESPN 2004–present
 Verne Lundquist – CBS 1984–1995, 1998–2016
 Brett Maher – Adelaide 36ers 2010–present
 Al McCoy – Phoenix Suns 1972–present
 Sean McDonough – CBS 1990–2000, ESPN 2000–present
 Al Michaels – ABC (US) 2003–2006
 Reggie Miller – TNT 2005–present
 Johnny Most – Boston Celtics 1953–1990
 Brent Musburger – CBS 1975–1989, ESPN/ABC 1990–2017
 Jim Nantz – CBS 1985–present
 Bob Neal
 Brad Nessler – ESPN 1992–2015, ABC (US) 1997–2015, CBS 2016–present
 Billy Packer – NBC 1974–1981, CBS 1981–2008
 Stephen Quartermain – Network Ten 1992–1997
 Bill Raftery – CBS 1986–present
 Ahmad Rashad – NBC 1990–2002
 Tony Ronaldson – Perth Wildcats 2010–2015
 Ryan Ruocco – ESPN 2013–present
 Bill Russell – ABC 1971–1973, CBS 1979–1983
 Bill Schonely – Portland Trail Blazers 1970–1998
 Kenny Smith – TNT 1998–present
 Dick Stockton – CBS 1981–1990, TNT 1995–present
 Chuck Swirsky
 Joe Tait – Cleveland Cavaliers 1970–1980, 1982–2011
 Mike Tirico – ABC (US) 2002–2016
 Jeff Van Gundy – TNT 2002–2003, ESPN/ABC 2007–present
 Dick Vitale – ESPN 1979–present
 Bill Walton – NBC 1990–2002, ESPN/ABC 2002–2009
 Bill Woods – Network Ten 1992–1997, 2014–2015

Bowls
 John Bell - BBC Sport 1987-2001
 Nick Brett - BBC Sport 2021
 David Bryant - BBC Sport 1982-1987
 David Corkill - BBC Sport 2000–present
 Dougie Donnelly - BBC Sport 1981-2002
 Janice Gower - YouTube
 Greg Harlow – BBC Sport 2005–present
 Sian Honnor - BBC Sport
 Mal Hughes - BBC Sport 1983-2001
 David McGill -BBC Sport 1984-1997
 John Price - BBC Sport 2002–present
 Andy Thomson - BBC Sport 2005–present
 David Vine - BBC Sport 1972-1989

Boxing
 Teddy Atlas – ESPN2
 Manish Bhasin – BBC Sport 2012–2014
 Michael Buffer
 Steve Bunce – BBC Radio 5 Live 2003–present, BBC Sport 2003–present, Setanta Sports 2006–2009, Boxnation 2011–present, Talksport 2013–present
 Harry Carpenter – BBC Sport 1949–1994 & 2001
 Fran Charles – HBO 2000–present
 Dave Clark – Sky Sports 2006–present
 Howard Cosell – (1918–1995, covered boxing, later denounced the sport; lead announcer on Monday Night Football for most of its existence): ABC (US) 1953–1985
 Mike Costello – BBC Radio 5 Live 2005–present
 Ian Darke – BBC Radio 1981–1992, Sky Sports 1992–2010, 2013, talksport 2014
 Paul Dempsey – Sky Sports 1990–2006, Setanta Sports 2006–2009, Boxnation 2011–present
 Don Dunphy
 George Foreman – HBO 1991–2004
 Randy Gordon – ESPN 1980–1982, USA Network, 1983–1988, MSG Network, 1986–1988
 Reg Gutteridge – ITV Sport 1962–1999, Sky Sports 1996–1999
 John Inverdale – BBC Sport 2001–2008
 Roy Jones Jr. – HBO 2004–2006
 Max Kellerman – ESPN 1998–2004, Fox Sports 2004–2005, HBO 2005–present
 Richard Keys – Boxnation 2011–2013
 Jim Lampley – HBO 1987–present
 Harold Lederman – HBO 1986–present
 Howard Leigh
 Jimmy Lennon, Jr.
 Lennox Lewis – HBO 2007–present, BBC Sport 2012
 Jimmy Magee – RTÉ Radio 1 1962–present, RTÉ Sport 1970s–2017
 Barry McGuigan – ITV Sport 1993–1995, 2005–2010, Sky Sports 1995–2005, 2010–2013, Boxnation 2013–present
 Larry Merchant – HBO 1978–2012
 Jim Neilly – BBC Radio 1982–1994, BBC Sport 1992–present
 Bob Papa
 Mark Pougatch − Channel 5 2011–present, ITV 2015–present
 John Rawling – BBC Radio 1987–2005, ITV Sport 2005–2010, Setanta Sports 2007–2009, Sky Sports 2010–2013, Boxnation 2011–present
 Ed Robinson – Sky Sports
 Jim Rosenthal – ITV Sport 1982–1996, 2005–2010, Boxnation 2012–present
 Bob Sheridan – ESPN2, 2003–2005 Don King Productions
 Barry Tompkins
 Jim Watt – ITV Sport 1984–1999, Sky Sports 1996–present
 Richie Woodhall – BBC Sport 2002–present, BBC Radio 5 Live 2002–present, Setanta Sports 2007–2009, Sky Sports 2010–present, talksport 2011, 2014, ITV Sport 2015–present
 Anna Woolhouse – Sky Sports 2016–present

Cricket

 Jonathan Agnew – BBC Radio 1991–present, BBC Sport 1999–2007 & 2017
 Paul Allott – BBC Sport 1994–1995, Sky Sports 1993–present
 Rex Alston – BBC Radio 1945–1964
 John Arlott – BBC Radio 1946–1980, BBC Sport 1951-1980
 Michael Atherton – Channel 4 2002–2005, talkSport 2002–2005, Sky Sports 2005–present
 Trevor Bailey – BBC Radio 1967–1999
 Jack Bannister – BBC Sport 1984–1999, talkSport 1999–2015
 Peter Baxter – BBC Radio 1973–2007
 Richie Benaud – BBC Sport 1960–1999, Nine Network 1977–2014, Channel 4 1999–2005, Channel 5 2009
 Harsha Bhogle – ESPN Star sports 1995–present
 Henry Blofeld – BBC Radio 1972–1991, 1994–2017, Sky Sports 1991–1994
 Ian Botham – Sky Sports 1995–2019
 Geoffrey Boycott – Sky Sports 1990–1998, BBC Sport 1993–1998, 2006–2007, talkSport 1998–2003, ESPN Star Sports 2001–2006, Channel 4 2003–2005, BBC Radio 2005–2019, Channel 5 2006–2019, Ten Sports 2006–2011
 Freddie Brown – BBC Radio 1957–1969
 James Brayshaw – Nine Network 2009–present
 Mark Butcher – Sky Sports 2009–present, ITV Sport 2011–2014
 Greg Chappell – Nine Network 1989–1994
 Ian Chappell – Nine Network 1983–present, ITV Sport 2011, Channel 5 2009
 Alastair Cook - BBC Radio 2019–present, BBC Television 2020–present
 Charles Colville – Sky Sports 1990–present
 Dennis Cometti – ABC (Aus) 1973–1986
 Denis Compton – BBC Sport 1958–1975
 Jeremy Coney – Sky Sport, New Zealand 1990s–2004, Sky Sports 2007–present
 Chris Cowdrey – talkSport 1999–2008
 Tony Cozier - BBC Radio 1966–2015, Channel Nine 1979–1989, Sky Sports 1990-2009
 Gerald de Kock – SABC, Supersport
 Graeme Fowler – BBC Radio 1993–2005
 Angus Fraser – BBC Radio 2002–2008, ITV Sport 2011
 Bill Frindall – BBC Radio 1966–2009
 Mike Gatting – BBC Radio 2000–2007
 Alan Gibson – BBC Radio 1962–1975
 Adam Gilchrist – Network Ten 2013–present
 Graham Gooch – BBC Radio 2002–2009
 David Gower – BBC Sport 1994–1999, Sky Sports 1999–2019
 Tony Greig – Nine Network 1984–2012, Channel 4 2005
 Ian Healy – Nine Network 1999–present, Channel 5 2015
 Michael Holding – Sky Sports 1990–present
 Mark Howard – Network Ten 2013–present
 Robert Hudson – BBC Sport 1949–1950, BBC Radio 1958–1968
 Simon Hughes – Channel 4 1999–2005, Channel 5 2006–2017, BBC Radio 2007–present, ITV 2010–2014
 Nasser Hussain – Sky Sports 2004–present
 Mike Hussey – Nine Network 2013–present
 Ray Illingworth – BBC Sport 1984–1993
 Brian Johnston – BBC Sport 1946–1969, BBC Radio 1965–1993 (on Test matches; he had earlier commentated for BBC Radio on county matches)
 Nick Knight – Sky Sports 2005–present
 Jim Laker – BBC Sport 1961–1985
 Tim Lane – ABC (Aus) 1988–present
 Bill Lawry – Nine Network 1980–present
 Brett Lee – Nine Network 2011–present
 Tony Lewis – BBC Radio 1977–1985, BBC Sport 1984–1998
 David Lloyd – Sky Sports 1990–1992 & 1999–present, BBC Radio 1991–1995
 Andrew Maher – Network Ten 2013–present
 Simon Mann – BBC Radio 1996–present, BBC Television 2020–present
 Vic Marks – BBC Radio 1992–present
 Howard Marshall – BBC Radio 1927–1945
 Christopher Martin-Jenkins – BBC Radio 1973–2012, BBC Sport 1981–1985
 Jim Maxwell – ABC (Aus) 1973–present
 Alan McGilvray – ABC (Aus) 1938–1985 (and also sometimes for× BBC Radio when Australia toured England)
 Alison Mitchell – BBC Radio 2007–present, Channel 5 2018–2019, BBC Television 2020-present
 Glenn Mitchell – ABC (Aus) 1990–present
 Don Mosey – BBC Radio 1974–1991
 Johnnie Moyes – ABC (Aus) 1950–1963
 Pat Murphy – BBC Radio 1983–present
 Mark Nicholas – Sky Sports 1995–1999, Channel 4 1999–2005, talksport 2002–2003, Nine Network 2003–2018, Channel 5 2006–2019, ITV Sport 2010–2011
 Simon O'Donnell – Nine Network 1996–2011
 Kerry O'Keeffe – ABC (Aus) 2001–present
 Mark Pougatch – BBC Radio 2006–2009, ITV Sport 2010–2012
 Peter Roebuck – ABC (Aus) 2001–2011
 Mike Selvey – BBC Radio 1988–2008
 Ravi Shastri – ESPN Star Sports 1994–present
 Navjot Singh Sidhu – ESPN Star Sports 1999–2003,  Ten Sports 2003–present
 Michael Slater – Channel 4 2001–2005, ABC (Aus) 2005–present, Nine Network 2005–present, Channel 5 2015
 Ed Smith – BBC Radio 2012–present, ITV Sport 2016
 Ian Smith – Sky Sport, New Zealand 1990s–, Channel 4 1999–2003
 Matt Smith – ITV Sport 2010–2014, BT Sport 2017–present
 E.W. Swanton – BBC Radio 1938–1975, BBC Sport 1948–1967
 Mark Taylor – Nine Network 1999–present
 Fred Trueman – BBC Radio 1974–1999, BBC Sport 1976-1982
 Phil Tufnell – BBC Radio 2003–present, BBC Sport 2020-present
 Michael Vaughan – BBC Radio 2009–present, Channel 5 2010–2019, BT Sport 2016–2018, BBC Sport 2020–present, 
 Ian Ward – Sky Sports 2003–present
 Shane Warne – Channel Nine 2008–present, Sky Sports 2009–2022
 Peter West – BBC Radio 1947–1952, BBC Sport 1952–1986
 Arlo White – BBC Radio 2005–2008
 Alan Wilkins – ESPN Star Sports 1997–present
 Bob Willis – BBC Sport 1985–1987, Sky Sports 1990–2019
 Arthur Wrigley – BBC Radio 1934–1965
 Norman Yardley – BBC Radio 1956–1969

Cycling
 Clare Balding – BBC Sport 2016
 Matt Barbet – Channel 4 2014–2015
 Chris Boardman – ITV Sport 2005–present, BBC Sport 2000–present
 OJ Borg – Channel 4 2015
 Kait Borsay – Channel 4 2014 – present
 Ned Boulting – ITV Sport 2001–present, Channel 4 2015
 Jason Bradbury – ITV Sport 2016
 Simon Brotherton – BBC Radio 5 Live 1994–present, BBC Sport 2013–present, Channel 4 2016
 Mark Cavendish – BBC Sport 2012, Channel 4 2015
 Nicole Cooke – Channel 4 2014
 Orla Chennaoui - Eurosport 2019-
 Dean Downing – Channel 4 2016
 Jill Douglas - BBC Sport 2021
 Rochelle Gilmore – BBC Sport ?–present
 Roger Hammond – ITV Sport 2013
 Rob Hayles – BBC Sport ?–present, Radio 5 Live ?–present, ITV Sport ?, Channel 4 2015
 Jake Humphrey – BBC Sport 2011–2012
 Gary Imlach – Channel 4 1994–2001, ITV Sport 2001–present
 Sean Kelly – Eurosport
 Richard Keys – Channel 4 1985–1989
 Phil Liggett – Channel 4 1985–2001, ITV Sport 2001–2015, Versus, 2004–present
 Graham Little – ITV Sport ?-2015, Channel 4 ?-2013
 Dan Lloyd – Eurosport
 Craig MacLean – BBC Sport 2013
 Lucy Martin – ITV Sport 2016
 James McCallum – Channel 4 2015
 Anthony McCrossan – ITV Sport ?
 David Millar – ITV Sport 2014–present
 Hugh Porter BBC Sport 1983–2012, ITV Sport 2007–present, Channel 4 2014 – present
 Shanaze Reade – BBC Sport(BMX) 2016
 James Richardson Eurosport 2006–present
 Jo Rowsell – Channel 4 2012–
 Paul Sherwen – Channel 4 1989–2001, ITV Sport 2001–2015, Versus 2004–present, SBS (Australia) Tour of France current 
 Brian Smith – ITV Sport ?-2015
 Sophie Smith – ITV Sport 2013, Channel 4 ?-2013
 Jamie Staff – BBC Sport 2014–present
 Matt Stephens – ITV Sport −2013, Channel 4 2016, Eurosport ?
 Rob Walker – Channel 4 2016
 Charlie Webster – ITV Sport 2016
 Sian Welby – ITV Sport ?, Channel 4 2014–2015
 Sidney White – official Rio 2016 cycling announcer
 Wong Kam-po –  Hong Kong Cable Television 2020 (Olympics only)

Darts
 Martin Adams – BBC Sport 2004–2011, Eurosport/Quest 2019-
 Vassos Alexander – BBC Radio 5 Live 2006–2010, BBC Sport 2011–2018, ESPN 2012–2013, BT Sport 2015–2018, Channel 4 2017–2018
 Caroline Barker – BBC Sport 2016–present
 Steve Beaton – ITV Sport 2007–2008, Nuts TV 2008, Eurosport 2010–2016
 Georgie Bingham - Eurosport/Quest 2019
 David Bobin – Sky Sports 1994, 2002–2003
 O.J. Borg – ITV Sport 2011, Nuts TV 2008
 Ned Boulting – ITV Sport 2007–present
 Eric Bristow – ITV Sport 1999, Sky Sports 1993–2016
 Sarah Cawood – Challenge TV 2007
 Helen Chamberlain – BBC Sport 2022, Sky Sports 2003–2009, Sky Box Office 2004
 Dave Clark – Sky Sports 2000–2020, Sky Box Office 2004
 David Coleman - BBC Sport 1979
 Nat Coombs - Eurosport/Quest 2019
 David Croft – BBC Radio 5 Live 2003–2006, BBC Sport 2005–2012, Setanta Sports 2008, ESPN UK 2011–2012, Sky Sports 2013–present
 Dickie Davies – ITV Sport 1974–1988
 Dan Dawson – ITV Sport 2014–present, talksport 2009–present, BBC Sport 2016–present
 Dougie Donnelly – BBC Sport 1993–1998
 Peter Drury – ITV Sport 2008–2011
 Mark Dudbridge – Sky Sports 2016
 Bobby George – BBC Sport 1998–2016, 2002, Eurosport 2014–2015, Channel 4 2017–2018
 Andy Goldstein - Sky Sports 2020
 Tony Green – BBC Sport 1979–2016, Challenge TV 2007, Setanta Sports 2008, ESPN UK 2011–2013, BT Sport 2015–2016
 Tony Gubba – BBC Sport 1983–1991
 John Gwynne – ITV Sport 1999 and 2010, Sky Box Office 2004, Challenge TV 2007, Sky Sports 1993–2013, Sky Sports 2015–present (part-time), Eurosport 2014–2015, 2020 Dave 2016, Eurosport 2019- ,Quest 2019-
 Ted Hankey – BBC Sport 2009–2012, BT Sport 2015, Eurosport 2015
 Rod Harrington – Sky Sports 2005–present, Challenge TV 2007, Nuts TV 2008, ITV Sport 2015
 Trevor Harris – Eurosport 2013–present
 Deta Hedman – Channel 4 2017–2018
 Eamonn Holmes – BBC Sport 1991–1992, ITV Sport 1999
 David Icke - BBC Sport 1988-1990
 John Inverdale – BBC Sport 1999–2000
 Charlotte Jackson – Setanta Sports 2008
 Peter Jones – ITV Sport 1972–1974
 Dave Lanning – ITV Sport 1972–1988, 1993–1996, talkSport 1999, Sky Box Office 2004, Sky Sports 1993–2010, Sky Sports 2013 (one-off return appearance)
 Wayne Mardle – Sky Sports 2010–present
 Chris Mason – ITV Sport 2008–present, Dave 2016, BT Sport 2017–present, Channel 4 2017–2018, talksport 2017–present, Eurosport/Quest 2019
 Scott Mitchell – ESPN 2013, BBC Sport 2014, Eurosport 2014–2015, Dave 2016
 Jason Mohammad – BBC Sport 2016–2017
 Chris Murphy - BBC Sport 2022
 Colin Murray – BBC Sport 2010–2016
 Gary Newbon – Sky Sports 2005
 Paul Nicholson – BBC Radio 5 Live 2014, ITV Sport 2015, BBC Sport 2016–present, Channel 4 2017–2018, Eurosport/Quest 2019-present
 Jacqui Oatley – ITV Sport 2015–present
 Janie Omorogbe – ITV Sport 2007–2010
 Tony O'Shea – BBC Sport 2009–2014, Eurosport 2014–2015, Dave 2016. Eurosport/Quest 2019
 John Part – BBC Sport 1995–2007, Sky Box Office 2004, ESPN UK 2012–2013, Sky Sports 2013–present
 Nigel Pearson - Sky Sports 1996-2022
 Devon Petersen - Sky Sports 2019-
 Jim Proudfoot – BBC Sport 2013–2015, ESPN UK 2012–2013, ITV Sport 2014, BT Sport 2015 & 2017–2018, Channel 4 2017–2018, talksport 2017-present
 Peter Purves – BBC Sport 1979–1983
 Stuart Pyke – Sky Sports 2003–present, Sky Box Office 2004, Challenge TV 2007, ITV Sport 2007–present, Nuts TV 2008, Bravo 2010, talksport 2017–present
 John Rawling – ITV Sport 2007–present, ESPN UK 2012, BBC Radio 5 Live 2014, BBC Sport 2014–2016, BT Sport 2015–2018, Dave 2016, Channel 4 2017–2018, talksport 2017-present, Eurosport/Quest 2019–present
 George Riley – BBC Sport 2015–present, BT Sport 2015–2016
 Adam Smith - Sky Sports 2020
 Matt Smith – ITV Sport 2007–2015, BT Sport 2017–present
 Jeff Stelling – Sky Sports 1993–2002, 2005
 Ray Stubbs – BBC Sport 1999, 2001–2009, 2022, ESPN UK 2011–2013, BT Sport 2015–2016, talksport 2017–present
 Phil Taylor – Sky Sports 2018
 Laura Turner (darts player) Eurosport 2019, Sky Sports 2019–present
 David Vine – BBC Sport 1975–1978 
 Sid Waddell – BBC Sport 1978–1994, talkSport 1999–2000, Sky Box Office 2004, Sky Sports 1994–2012
 Rob Walker – BBC Sport 2009–2016, Channel 4 2017–2018
 Alan Warriner-Little – ITV Sport 2007–present, Nuts TV 2008, BBC Sport 2016–present
 Mark Webster – BBC Sport 2016–present, Sky Sports 2018–present, ITV Sport 2020
 Anna Woolhouse - Sky Sports 2022-
 Tony Wrighton – ITV Sport 2011

Figure Skating 

 Ted Barton
 Robin Cousins – BBC
 Lina Fedorova – Telesport
 Tara Lipinski – NBC
 Evgenia Medvedeva – Channel One
 Anna Pogorilaya – Eurosport Russia
 Irina Slutskaya – Channel One
 Tatiana Tarasova
 Maxim Trankov – Channel One
 Johnny Weir – NBC
 Katarina Witt – ARD
 Alexei Yagudin – Channel One
 Alina Zagitova – Channel One

Golf
 Paul Affleck – BBC Radio 2003-2005
 Peter Alliss – BBC Sport 1961–2020, ABC (US) 1975–2016
 Brian Anderson – TNT 2019
 Paul Azinger – ABC (US) 2006–2016, BBC Sport 2014–present, FOX 2016–2019, NBC 2019–present
 Ian Baker-Finch – ABC (US) 1998–2006, CBS 2006–present
 Seve Ballesteros – BBC Sport 2003-2004
 Eilidh Barbour – BBC Sport 2017–present
 Rich Beem – Sky Sports 2015–present
 Gary Bender – TBS 1992
 Chris Berman – ESPN 1986-2014
 Richard Boxall – BBC Sport 1999, Sky Sports
 Billy Ray Brown – ABC (US) 1999–2016
 Ken Brown – Sky Sports 1992–2000, BBC Sport 2000–present, Setanta Sports 2007–2009
 Joe Buck – Fox 2015-2019
 Donna Caponi – TBS 1991
 Bob Carpenter USA 1988-1989
 Harry Carpenter – BBC Sport 1965–1994
 Andrew Castle – Sky Sports 1992–2000
 Bobby Clampett – CBS / TBS / TNT 1991–2007
 Clive Clark – BBC Sport 1977-1995
 Howard Clark – BBC Sport 1993, 1999, Sky Sports 1999–present
 Darren Clarke – Sky Sports 2014–present
 David Coleman – BBC Sport 1967-1981
 Bob Costas – NBC 2003-2013
 Andrew Cotter – BBC Sport 2004–present, BBC Radio 2000–2004, 2012–present
 Henry Cotton – BBC Sport 1978-1982
 Bill Cox – BBC Sport 1959-1968
 Bruce Critchley – BBC Sport 1980–1993, Sky Sports 1994-2017
 Bernard Darwin – BBC Radio 1930-1947
 Laura Davies – BBC Sport 2001-2005
 Bruce Devlin – ESPN 1986
 Dougie Donnelly – BBC Sport 1990–2008
 Kitrina Douglas – BBC Radio 1995-2004
 David Duval – ESPN 2020–present
 Paul Eales – BBC Radio 1997-2005
 Dick Enberg – NBC 1995–2000, CBS 2000–2010
 Nick Faldo – ABC (US) 2004–2007, CBS 2007–present, BBC Sport 2012–2014, Sky Sports 2016
 David Feherty – CBS 1997–2016, NBC 2016–present
 Bill Flemming – ABC 1966
 Russell Fuller – BBC Radio 2001-2010
 Bernard Gallacher – BBC Radio 2006–present
 Terry Gannon – ABC (US) 1991–2016, NBC 2016–present
 Frank Gifford – CBS 1969–1971, ABC 1971-1973
 Frank Glieber – CBS 1968-1985
 Wayne Grady – BBC Sport 2000–2013
 Alan Green – BBC Radio 1988-2003
 Butch Harmon – Sky Sports 1996–present
 Alex Hay – BBC Sport 1978–2004
 Chick Hearn – NBC 1959-1965
 Dan Hicks – NBC 1992–present
 Tommy Horton – BBC Radio 1988-1997
 Bernard Hunt – BBC Sport 1978
 Denis Hutchinson – BBC Sport 1999-2000
 Andre Iguodala – TBS 2018
 Trevor Immelman – TNT 2017–present
 John Inverdale – BBC Radio 1988–present
 Hazel Irvine – BBC Sport 1994-2017
 Tony Jacklin – ABC 1974, BBC Sport 1980–1989, 2012
 Keith Jackson – ABC 1967
 John Jacobs – BBC Sport 1967
 Peter Jacobsen – ABC 1993-1994
 Mark James – BBC Sport 2001–present
 Ernie Johnson Jr. – TBS / TNT 1995-2018
 David Jones – BBC Radio 1996-1997
 Gary Koch – NBC 1996–present
 Peter Kostis – CBS 1992–present
 Renton Laidlaw – BBC Radio 1974-1992
 David Leadbetter – TBS 1991-1994
 Robert Lee – Sky Sports 2000–present
 Justin Leonard – NBC 2017-2018
 Gary Lineker – BBC Sport 2001–2009
 David Livingstone – Sky Sports 1994-2018
 Henry Longhurst – BBC Radio 1937–1957, BBC Sport 1949–1977, CBS 1965–1975, ABC 1967
 Verne Lundquist – CBS 1983–1995, 1998– TNT 1995–1998, 2006, 2011
 Bill Macatee – CBS 1990–present
 Maureen Madill – BBC Radio 1997–2006, BBC Sport 2000-present
 Andrew Maher – Network Ten 2009–2011
 Roger Maltbie – NBC 1995–present
 Dave Marr – ABC 1970–1991, BBC Sport 1992-1997
 Stephen McAllister – BBC Sport 1999
 Gary McCord – CBS 1986–present
 Mark McCormack – BBC Sport 1967-1995
 Sean McDonough – CBS 1996–1999, ESPN 2010–present
 Ross McFarlane – Sky Sports 2001–present
 Eddie McGuire – Nine Network 2009–2011
 Jim McKay – CBS 1957–1961, ABC 1962–1993, 1996-2001
 Conor McNamara – BBC Radio 2006–present
 Steve Melnyk – CBS 1991, ABC 1992-1997
 Cliff Michelmore – BBC Sport 1964
 Cary Middlecoff – ESPN 1982
 Johnny Miller – NBC 1990–2019
 Colin Montgomerie – Sky Sports
 Don Mosey – BBC Radio 1977-1984
 Andrew Murray – BBC Radio 1992-2007
 Ewen Murray – Sky Sports 1991–present
 Brent Musburger – CBS 1983–1989, ABC 1992–1994, ABC 1992–1996, ESPN 2008-2016
 Jim Nantz – CBS 1985–present, BBC Sport 2010–2012
 Bob Neal – TBS 1991-1994
 Byron Nelson – ABC 1965-1974
 Lindsey Nelson – NBC 1954-1965
 Jack Newton – BBC Sport 1984
 Alison Nicholas – BBC Radio 2005-2006
 Jack Nicklaus – ABC 1986-1994
 Frank Nobilo – BBC Sport 2013-2015
 Greg Norman – Fox 2015
 Brett Ogle – Foxtel 1997–present
 Peter Oosterhuis – Sky Sports 1994–present, BBC Sport 1994–1995, The Golf Channel 1995–1997, CBS 1997–present
 Bud Palmer – CBS 1956, NBC 1959-1965
 Lou Palmer – ESPN 1982-1985
 Philip Parkin – Golf Channel 2000–present, BBC Sport 2009-present
 Jerry Pate – BBC Sport 1999-2000
 Dottie Pepper – NBC 2005–2013, 2015–present
 Dan Pohl – NBC 1995
 Mark Pougatch – BBC Radio 5 Live 1999–present, BBC Sport 2011
 Ronan Rafferty – Sky Sports 1997–2007, Setanta Sports 2007–2009
 Chris Rea – BBC Radio 1975-1996
 Dai Rees – BBC Sport 1965-1967
 Steve Rider – ITV Sport 1981–1985, Channel 4 1983–1985, BBC Sport 1985–2005
 Sandy Roberts – Seven Network 1980–2008, 2012–2013
 Mark Roe – BBC Radio 2007–2012, Sky Sports c.2013-present
 Gene Sarazen – NBC 1955
 Chris Schenkel – CBS 1956–1964, ABC 1965-1975
 John Schroeder – NBC 1995
 Ray Scott – NBC 1959–1965, CBS 1969-1974
 Vin Scully – CBS 1975–1982
 Jim Simpson – NBC 1964–1965, ESPN 1982-1986
 Marilynn Smith – ABC 1973
 Curtis Strange – ABC (US) 1995–2004, ESPN 2008–present, BBC 2013, FOX 2016–present
 Ed Sullivan – NBC 1959
 Pat Summerall – CBS 1968–1994
 Dave Thomas – BBC Sport 1975-1977
 Peter Thomson – BBC Sport 1962-1997
 Mike Tirico – ABC (US) 1996–2016, NBC 2016–present
 Sam Torrance – BBC Sport 2002–2011, Sky Sports 2014–present
 Jay Townsend – BBC Radio 2000-presnet
 Lee Trevino – NBC 1983–1989
 Roger Twibell – ABC 1987-1991
 Jean van de Velde – BBC Sport 2004, 2010
 Scott Van Pelt – NBC 2017–present, ESPN 2020-present
 Ken Venturi – CBS 1967–2002
 Lanny Wadkins – CBS 2000–2006, GOLF Channel 2014–present
 Mickey Walker – BBC Sport 1993-2001
 Tom Watson – ABC 2008
 Jack Whitaker – CBS 1965–1966, ABC 1982-1989
 Gary Wolstenholme – BBC Sport 1997–2007, Sky Sports 2013

Horse racing
 Chic Anderson – CBS 1970–1979
 Clare Balding – BBC Radio 5 Live 1994–2012, BBC Sport 1996–2012, Channel 4 2013–2016
 Peter Bromley – BBC Sport 1958–c. 1970, BBC Radio 1959–2001
 Charlsie Cantey – CBS 1977–1986, ESPN 1985–2002, ABC 1986–2001, NBC 2000–2005
 Willie Carson – BBC Sport 1997–2012
 Ed Chamberlin – ITV Sport 2017–present
 Larry Collmus – NBC 2011–present
 Trevor Denman – ESPN 2006–present
 Tom Durkin – NBC 1984–2010
 Mick Fitzgerald – BBC Sport 2009–2012, Channel 4 2013–2016, ITV Sport 2017–present
 John Francome – Channel 4 1987–2012, BBC Radio 5 Live 2016
 Raleigh Gilbert – BBC Sport/BBC Radio 1970–1972, ITV Sport 1972–1985, Channel 4 1984–1996
 Raymond Glendenning – BBC Radio at least 1938–1960
 Graham Goode – ITV Sport 1969–1985, Channel 4 1984–2010
 Tom Hammond – NBC 1984–present
 Simon Holt – Channel 4 1994–2016
 Dave Johnson – ABC 1978–2000 ESPN 1985–2002
 Chris Lincoln – ESPN 1985–2007
 Nick Luck – Channel 4 2013–2016
 Cornelius Lysaght – BBC Radio 1992–present
 John McCririck – ITV Sport 1981–1984, Channel 4 1984–2012
 Jim McGrath (Australian, known as "J.A. McGrath" when he writes for The Daily Telegraph to avoid confusion): BBC Sport 1992–2012
 Jim McGrath (British) – ITV Sport 1981–1984, Channel 4 1984–2016
 John Oaksey – ITV Sport 1969–1985, Channel 4 1984–2002
 Bob Neumeier – NBC
 Michael O'Hehir – RTÉ Radio 1 1951–1985 (he sometimes also worked for the BBC, for example commentating on the Grand National)
 Peter O'Sullevan – BBC Radio 1947–1962, BBC Sport 1947–1997
 Richard Pitman – BBC Sport 1975–2012
 Walter Swinburn – Channel 4 2000–2004
 Bill Tung – Rediffusion Television/ATV Home 1967–1997, 2003–2005

Ice hockey
 Bruce Affleck – St. Louis Blues 1987–2000 (KPLR, Prime Sports Midwest)
 John Ahlers – Anaheim Ducks 2003–present (Bally Sports West, Bally Sports SoCal),
 Kenny Albert – Fox 1995–1999, NBC (2012–2021), TBS/TNT (2021–present)
 Marv Albert – NBC 1990–1994
 Steve Armitage – CBC 1977–present
 Jamie Baker – San Jose Sharks 2014–present (NBC Sports California)
 Scotty Bowman – CBC 1987–1990
 Rick Bowness – CBC 1993–1996
 Herb Brooks – SportsChannel America 1988–1991
 Dean Brown – CBC 2000–present, Ottawa Senators 1997–present (Sportsnet Ontario)
 John Buccigross – ESPN 1998–2004, 2021–present, ABC 2021–present
 Cassie Campbell-Pacall – CBC 2006–present, Calgary Flames 2014–present (Sportsnet Pacific/SN Flames)
 Don Cherry – CBC 1981–present
 Bill Clement – ESPN/ABC 1986–1988, 1992–2004, ESPN/ABC 1999–2004, Philadelphia Flyers 1989–1992, 2007–2020 (SportsChannel Philadelphia, NBC Sports Philadelphia)
 Bob Cole – CBC 1969–present
 Ward Cornell – CBC 1958–1971
 Marc Crawford – CBC 1998–1999
 Fred Cusick – Boston Bruins on WSBK-38 1971–1997, NESN 1983–1995
 Chris Cuthbert – CBC/CBC 1984–2005, 2020–present TSN Hockey 2005–2020, NBC 2005–2020, Sportsnet 2020–present
 Keith Dancy – CBC 1952–1966
 Ken Daniels – CBC 1992–1997, Detroit Red Wings regional broadcasts 1997–present (channel 50, Bally Sports Detroit)
 Ted Darling – CBC 1955–1970
 John Davidson – CBC 1983–1986, 1995–2006, Fox 1995–1999, ESPN 1993–94, ABC 2000–2002 (as studio analyst), 1993–94, 2003–04 (as color commentator) NBC 2006, New York Rangers 1986–2006 (MSG Network)
 Jack Dennett – CBC
 Gary Dornhoefer – CBC 1978–1986, Philadelphia Flyers 1992–2006 (SportsChannel Philadelphia, Comcast SportsNet Philadelphia)
 Bruce Dowbiggin – CBC 1984–present
 Mike Emrick – ESPN 1986–1988, ABC 1993–1994, 2000–2004, New Jersey Devils 1983–86, 1993–2011 (SportsChannel New York, MSG Network, MSG Plus), Philadelphia Flyers 1989–1993 (SportsChannel Philadelphia) Fox 1995–1999, NBC 2005–2020
 Brian Engblom – ESPN 1992–2004, ABC 1993–1994, 2000–2004, Versus 2005–2011 (as studio analyst), NBC 2011–2015, Tampa Bay Lightning 2015–present (Bally Sports Sun)
 Bernie Federko – St. Louis Blues 2000–present (KPLR, Bally Sports Midwest)
 Ray Ferraro – ESPN/ABC 2002–2004 (as studio analyst), 2021–present (as lead color commentator) Edmonton Oilers 2003–2008 (Rogers Sportsnet), NBC 2006–07, 2015–2021 TSN 2008–present (Toronto Maple Leafs and Ottawa Senators 2014–present)
 Elmer Ferguson – CBC
 John Ferguson – CBC 1973–1975
 Patrick Flatley – CBC 1998–1999
 Pat Foley – Chicago Blackhawks 1980–2006, 2008-2022 (SportsChannel Chicago, HawkVision, NBC Sports Chicago, WGN-TV)
 Jim Fox – Los Angeles Kings 1990–present
 Elliotte Friedman – CBC 2003–present
 Martine Gaillard – CBC 1998–2004
 Garry Galley – CBC 2007–present, Ottawa Senators 2007–2010 (Sportsnet Ontario), Sportsnet 2014–present
 Danny Gallivan – CBC 1950–1984
 John Garrett – CBC 1986–1998, 2006–2008, 2014–present, Sportsnet 1998–2002, 2014–present Vancouver Canucks 2002–present (Sportsnet Pacific/SN Canucks), Calgary Flames 1998–2008 (RSN Pacific)
 Bob Goldham – CBC 1960–1964
 Bill Good, Jr. – CBC 1970–1977
 Randy Hahn – San Jose Sharks 1991–present (SportsChannel Pacific, Fox Sports Bay Area, Fox Sports Net Bay Area, FSN Bay Area, NBC Sports California)
 Brian Hayward – Anaheim Ducks 1993–present (Bally Sports West, Bally Sports SoCal), CBC 1995–2004, ESPN/ABC, ESPN/ABC 2000, NBC 2006–07, 2012–14
 Bret Hedican – San Jose Sharks 2011–present (NBC Sports California)
 Bill Hewitt – CBC 1958–1982
 Foster Hewitt – CBC Radio 1931–1963, CBC 1952–1960
 Dave Hodge – CBC 1971–1987
 Kelly Hrudey – CBC 1998–present, Sportsnet 2014–present
 Jim Hughson – CBC 1985–1986, 2006–present, TSN 1987–1994, Sportsnet 1998–2002, 2014–present Vancouver Canucks 1998–2008 (RSN Pacific)
 Bobby Hull – CBC 1980–1983
 Dick Irvin Jr. – CBC 1966–1999
 Brenda Irving – CBC 2001–2006
 Rick Jeanneret – Buffalo Sabres 1971–2022 (WUTV, WIVB-TV, Empire Sports Network, MSG Network/MSG Western New York)
 Dan Kelly – St. Louis Blues 1969–1988 (KPLR, KDNL-TV) CBS 1969–1972, 1980, NHL Network 1975 1975–1980, Hughes 1979–80, CBC 1977–1980, CBC 1977–1980, USA Network 1979–85, ESPN 1985–86, CTV 1984–86, Canwest/Global 1987–88
 John Kelly – St. Louis Blues 1989–1992, 2006–present (KPLR, Bally Sports Midwest), Tampa Bay Lightning 1993–1995 (Bally Sports Sun), Fox 1997–98, Colorado Avalanche 1995–2004 (Altitude)
 Mark Lee – CBC/CBC 1997–2014
 Steve Levy – ESPN 1993–2004, 2021–present, ABC 1999–2004, 2021–present
 Doug MacLean – CBC/Sportsnet
 Ron MacLean – CBC/Sportsnet 1986–present, CBC/Sportsnet 2014–present
 Jeff Marek – CBC 2007–present, CBC 2009–2011
 Jiggs McDonald – Los Angeles Kings 1967–1972 (KTLA), Atlanta Flames 1996–1980 (WTCG 17), New York Islanders 1980–1995, 2016–2017 (WOR-TV, SportsChannel New York, MSG Network/MSG+), SportsChannel America 1988–1992, Toronto Maple Leafs 1995–1998, Florida Panthers 2003–04, 2006–07 (Fox Sports Florida)
 Brian McFarlane – CBC 1964–1989, NBC 1972–1975
 Pierre McGuire – TSN 2002–2011, NBC 2006–present
 Wes McKnight – CBC 1952–1958
 Peter McNab – SportsChannel America 1988–1992, New Jersey Devils 1989–1995 (SportsChannel New York), Fox 1996–1999, Colorado Avalanche 1995–2004 (Altitude), NBC 2006–07
 Howie Meeker – Vancouver Canucks 1975–1980 (BCTV), CBC 1968–1987, TSN 1987–1998
 Tom Mees – ESPN 1985–88, 1992–93 (as studio host), 1992–96 (as play-by-play announcer) ABC 1993–1994)
 Barry Melrose – ESPN 1996–2004, 2021–present, ABC 1999–2004, 2021–present
 Mark Messier – ESPN/ABC 2021–present
 Joe Micheletti – St. Louis Blues 1985–1988, 1992–1998 (KPLR, Bally Sports Midwest) Fox 1995–1999, New York Islanders 1998–2006 (Fox Sports Net New York), MSG Network 2006–present (New York Rangers)
 Greg Millen – CBC 1995–1998, 1999–present, Sportsnet 2014–present, Ottawa Senators 2006–present (Sportsnet Ontario), Toronto Maple Leafs 2006–present (Sportsnet Ontario)
 Bob Miller – Los Angeles Kings 1973–present
 Gord Miller – TSN 2002–present (Toronto Maple Leafs and Ottawa Senators 2014–present)
 A. J. Mleczko – NBC 2018–present, New York Islanders 2018–present (MSG Network/MSG Plus)
 Scott Morrison – CBC
 Lou Nanne – CBC 1979, CBS 1980, Minnesota Wild 2019–present (Bally Sports North
 Harry Neale – CBC 1985–present, Toronto Maple Leafs 1986–2007, Buffalo Sabres 2007–2012 (MSG Network)
 Bob Neumeier – WBZ 1996–1999
 Scott Oake – CBC/CBC 1988–present, Sportsnet 2014–present
 Eddie Olczyk – Pittsburgh Penguins 2000–2003 (Fox Sports Pittsburgh), NBC 2006–present, Chicago Blackhawks 2006–present (NBC Sports Chicago, WGN-TV), TBS/TNT 2021–present
 Darren Pang – ESPN 1992–2004, ABC 1993–1994, 2000–2004, NBC 2007–2021, TBS/TNT 2021–present, Chicago Blackhawks 1990–1995 (SportsChannel Chicago, Hawkvision), St. Louis Blues 2009–present (Bally Sports Midwest), Arizona Coyotes 2005–2009 (Bally Sports Arizona), St. Louis Blues 2009–present (Bally Sports Midwtst)
 Jim Peplinski – CBC 1990–1995, 1997, Calgary Flames 1990–1995, 1997 (CICT-DT)
 Lloyd Pettit – WGN-TV, Chicago Blackhawks 1956–76
 Gerry Pinder – CBC 1979–1981
 Walter Pratt – CBC 1970–1978
 Bruce Rainnie – CBC 2003–present, CBC 2003–2014
 Mickey Redmond – CBC 1980–1987, CBC 1980–1987, Detroit Red Wings 1985–present (channel 50, Bally Sports Detroit)
 Drew Remenda – San Jose Sharks 2006–2007, 2007–2014 (Fox Sports Net Bay Area, NBC Sports California) CBC 2006–2007
 Chico Resch – CBC 1978, 1988, Minnesota North Stars 1987–89 (KMSP-TV, KMSP-TV, Midwest Sports Channel) New Jersey Devils 1996–2014 (SportsChannel New York, Fox Sports Net New York, MSG Network/MSG Plus)
 Jim Robson – CBC 1970–1985, BCTV, CHEK 1970–present (BCTV, CHEK, Canucks TV)
 Howie Rose – New York Islanders 1995–2016 (SportsChannel New York, Fox Sports Net New York, FSN New York, MSG Network/MSG Plus)
 Sam Rosen – MSG Network 1984–present, Fox 1995–1999
 Scott Russell – CBC/CBC 1989–2003, 2005–present
 Derek Sanderson – Boston Bruins on WSBK-38 1984–1997, NESN 1984–1995
 John Saunders – ESPN/ABC 1992–2004, ESPN/ABC 1992–2004, 2000–2004
 Dave Shea – NESN 1984–2004
 Steve Shutt – CBC 1990–1994
 Craig Simpson – Sportsnet 1998–2002, 2014–present, CBC 2007–present
 Doug Smith – CBC
 P.J. Stock – CBC 2007–present
 Red Storey – CBC
 Gary Thorne – New Jersey Devils 1987–93 (SportsChannel New York, ESPN 1992–2004, ABC 1999–2004
 Ron Tugnutt – CBC 2005–2007
 John Wells – CBC/CBC 1979–1984
 Ed Westfall – New York Islanders 1979–1995 (WOR-TV, SportsChannel New York), SportsChannel America 1979–1992
 Ken Wilson – ESPN 1985–86, St. Louis Blues 1985–2004 (KPLR, Fox Sports Midwest)
 Don Wittman – CBC/CBC 1979–2008

Kickboxing
 Michael Schiavello – HDNet
 Will Vanders – Eurosport 2002–present

Electronic Sports
 Sam "Kobe" Hartman-Kenzler – Riot Games 2012–present
 Christopher "MonteCristo" Mykles – OnGameNet 2012–2017, Blizzard Entertainment 2017–2019
 Erik "DoA" Lonnquist – OnGameNet 2012–2017, Blizzard Entertainment 2017–2019, 2021

Motorsport
 James Allen – ESPN 1992–1997, ITV Sport 1997–2008, talksport 2009–2011, BBC Radio 5 Live 2012–2015, BBC Sport 2013–2015, Ten Sport 2010–present
 Jack Arute – ABC (US) 1984–2009, Versus 2009–2011
 Mark Beretta – Seven Network 2007–2014
 Dick Berggren – CBS 1994–2000, 2014–present, Fox 2001–2012
 Allen Bestwick NBC/TNT Sports 1999–2007, ESPN/ABC 2007–present
 Mark Blundell – ITV Sport 1997–2008, Sky Sports 2012–present
 Martin Brundle – BBC Sport 1989, 1995, 2009–2011, ITV Sport 1997–2008, Sky Sports 2012–present
 Steve Byrnes – Fox 2001–2015
 David Coulthard – BBC Sport 2009–2015, Channel 4 2016–present
 Charlie Cox – BBC Sport 1996–2013
 David Croft – BBC Radio 5 Live 2006–2011, ITV Sport 2007–2008, BBC Sport 2009–2011, Sky Sports 2012–present
 Neil Crompton – ABC (Aus) 1980–1984, Seven Network 1985–1995, 2007–2014, Network Ten 1996–2006, Fox Sports and Ten sports 2015–present
 Anthony Davidson – BBC Radio 5 Live 2008–2011, BBC Sport 2009–2011, Sky Sports 2012–present
 Leigh Diffey – BBC 1999–2001, SPEED 2001–2004, 2007– Network Ten 2004–2007, SPEED 2007–2012, NBC Sports 2013–present
 Chris Economaki – ABC (US) 1961–1984, CBS 1984–1990, ESPN 1987–1989
 Ben Edwards – Eurosport 1993–2002, ITV 2002–2011, Sky Sports 2002–2011, BBC Sport 2012–2015, Channel 4 2016–present
 Calvin Fish – Motor Trend TV, GT World
 Louise Goodman – ITV Sport 1997–present
 Scott Goodyear – ABC (US) 2001–present
 Jeff Gordon – Fox 2016–present
 Jennie Gow – BBC Sport 2010, 2012–2015 & 2018-present, BBC Radio 5 Live 2011 & 2012–present, ITV Sport 2014–2016
 Maurice Hamilton – BBC Radio 5 Live 1992–2011, BBC Sport 2009–2011, talksport 2012–present
 Jeff Hammond – Fox 2001–present
 Martin Haven – Eurosport
 Johnny Herbert – Sky Sports 2012–present
 Damon Hill – Sky Sports 2012–present
 John Hindhaugh – Eurosport, Radio Le Mans 1989–
 Jake Humphrey – BBC Sport 2009–2012
 James Hunt – BBC Sport 1980–1993
 Tony Jardine – BBC Sport 1992–1996, ITV 1997–2005, Sky Sports 2005–present
 Bob Jenkins – ESPN, ABC (US) 1979–2003, Speed Channel 2003–2006, Versus 2010–2013
 Eddie Jordan – BBC Sport 2009–2015, Channel 4 2016–present
 Mike Joy – CBS 1984–2000, Premiere 1996–2001, Fox 2001–present
 Ted Kravitz – ITV Sport 2002–2008, BBC Sport 2009–2011, Sky Sports 2012–present
 Simon Lazenby – Sky Sports 2012–present
 Jonathan Legard – BBC Radio 1997–2004, 2012, BBC Sport 2009–2010
 Lee McKenzie – Worked for ITV and Sky previously, BBC Sport 2009–2015, Channel 4 2016–present
 Larry McReynolds – Fox 2001–present
 Paul Page – Voice of Indianapolis 500 Mile Race 1977–1987, NBC Sports 1978–1987, ABC Sports 1987 - 2017, ESPN 1979-2017
 Jonathan Palmer – BBC Sport 1993–1996
 Jolyon Palmer – BBC Sport 2018–
 Suzi Perry – Sky Sports 1997–2000, BBC Sport 2000–2009 & 2013–2015, BT Sport 2016–present
 Natalie Pinkham – BBC Sport 2011, BBC Radio 5 Live 2011, Sky Sports 2012–present
 Marty Reid – ABC/ESPN 2001–2013
 Steve Rider – BBC Sport 1985–1996, ITV Sport 2006–present, Sky Sports 2012–present
 Matt Roberts – BBC Sport 2005–2013, Eurosport 2014–present
 Greg Rust – Network Ten 1997–present, Fox Sports 2015–present
 Holly Samos – BBC Radio 5 Live 2007–2011, Channel 4 2016
 Angus Scott – ITV Sport 2002–2006
 Steve Scott – Channel 5 2000–2002
 Barry Sheene – Network Ten 1997–2002
 Mark Skaife – Seven Network 2009–2014, Fox Sports 2015–present
 Ken Squier – CBS Sports/Turner Sports/TNN Motorsports/MRN Motor Racing Network/World Sports Enterprises/Motor Week Illustrated 1971–present
 Jackie Stewart – ABC (US) 1971–1984
 Simon Taylor – BBC Radio 1976–1997, ITV Sport 1997
 Georgie Thompson – Sky Sports 2012
 Wendy Venturini – Speed 2006–2013
 Krista Voda – Speed (2001–2013), Fox (2007–2014), NBC (2015–present)
 Murray Walker – BBC Sport 1949–1996, ITV Sport 1997–2001, Network Ten 2006–2007, BBC Radio 2007, BBC Sport Website 2009–2015, Channel 4 2016–present
 Darrell Waltrip – Fox 2001–present
 John Watson – Eurosport 1990–1997, ESPN 1997–1998, BBC Sport 1998–2001, Sky Sports 2002–present, GT World 2016–present
 Matthew White – Network Ten 2015–present, Seven Network 2007–2014
 Bill Woods – Network Ten 1997–2006

Pool
 Karl Boyes - Sky Sports 2021-
 Allison Fisher - Sky Sports 2020-
 Ted Lerner – Sky Sports 2013
 Andy McDonald – Sky Sports
 Michael McMullan - Sky Sports 2020
 Nick Schulman - Sky Sports 2021
 Sid Waddell – Sky Sports 1995–2005
 Jim Wych – Sky Sports 1990–present

Rugby league
 Greg Alexander – Fox Sports 2001–present
 Braith Anasta – Fox Sports 2015–present
 Danny Buderus – Fox Sports 2016–present
 Gary Belcher – Fox Sports 2005–2017, Seven Network – 2017
 Laurie Daley – Fox Sports 1999–2007, 2009–present, Nine Network 2008
 Jonathan Davies – BBC Sport 1997–present
 Darrell Eastlake – Nine Network 1982–2005
 Michael Ennis – Fox Sports 2017–present
 Ray French – BBC Sport 1979–2013
 Mark Gasnier – Fox Sports 2012–present
 Ray Hadley – Nine Network 2012–present
 Eddie Hemmings – BBC Radio 1983–1990, Sky Sports 1990–present
 Andrew Johns – Nine Network 2007–present
 Matthew Johns – Nine Network 2003–2009, Fox Sports 2010–present
 Brett Kimmorley – Fox Sports 2010–present, Seven Network 2017–present
 Wally Lewis – Nine Network 2006–present
 Erin Molan  – Nine Network 2012–present, sideline commentator
 Rex Mossop – Seven Network 1970–1986, Network Ten 1986–1990
 Stuart Pyke – BBC Radio 5 Live 2002–present
 Steve Roach – Nine Network 1990–1992, – Fox Sports 2016–present
 Warren Smith – Fox Sports 1995–present
 Mike Stephenson – Sky Sports 1990–present
 Peter Sterling – Nine Network 1992–present
 Paul Vautin – Nine Network 1994–present
 Andrew Voss – Nine Network 1994–present, Premier Sports 2013, BBC Sport 2013
 Eddie Waring – BBC Sport 1951–1981
 Ray Warren – Network Ten 1976–1986, Nine Network 1990–present
 Dave Woods – BBC Radio 5 Live 1994–2009, BBC Sport 2000–present, Premier Sports 2012–2014

Rugby union
 Rob Andrew – BBC Radio 5 Live 1999–2005
 Stuart Barnes – BBC Sport/BBC Radio 5 Live 1995–1996, Sky Sports 1996–present, ITV Sport 2007, Sky NZ 2011, TV3 Ireland 2015
 Martin Bayfield – BBC Radio 5 Live 2001–2007, ITV Sport 2007–2013 & 2015–present, BT Sport 2013–present
 Gordon Bray –  ABC (Aus) 1971–1988, Network Ten 1988–1991, 2013–present, Seven Network 1991–2006, Fox Sports 2007–2012
 Matt Burke – Network Ten 2013–present
 Eddie Butler – BBC Sport 1991–present, Channel 4 2018-present, Premier Sports 2018–present
 Jon Champion – ITV Sport 2007, 2015
 Andrew Cotter – BBC Radio 5 Live 2000–2004 & 2015–present, BBC Sport 2004–present, ESPN UK 2011–2013, BT Sport 2014–present
 Lawrence Dallaglio – BBC Sport 2009–2013, ITV Sport 2011 & 2015–present, BT Sport 2013–present
 Jonathan Davies – BBC Sport 1997–present
 Matt Dawson – BBC Radio 5 Live 2007–present, BBC Sport 2012, BT Sport 2013–2016
 Jill Douglas – BBC Sport 1997–1999 & 2003–2015, Sky Sports 1999–2003, Setanta Sports 2007–2009, ITV Sport 2011 & 2013–present
 Craig Doyle – BBC Sport 2004–2008, ITV Sport 2008–2013, 2015 & 2019, BT Sport 2013–present
 Mark Durden-Smith – Sky Sports 1997–2002, ITV Sport 2007 & 2013–2017, ESPN UK 2010–2013, Channel 5 2017 – present
 Martin Gillingham – ITV Sport 2009–present, Sky Sports 2009–present, BT Sport 2013–2014
 Will Greenwood – Sky Sports 2006–present, ITV Sport 2007
 George Gregan – ITV Sport 2015
 Jeremy Guscott – BBC Sport 1996–present, ITV Sport 1999, OSN 2015
 Miles Harrison – BBC Radio 1991–1994, Sky Sports 1994–present, ITV Sport 2007, 2015–present, SKY NZ 2011
 Austin Healey – ITV Sport 2003, BBC Radio 5 Live 2006–2010, BBC Sport 2006–2010, ESPN UK 2010–2013, BT Sport 2013–present
 Alastair Hignell – BBC Radio 1986–1989, ITV Sport 1991–1996, BBC Radio 5 Live 1996–2008
 John Inverdale – Sky Sports 1990, BBC Sport 1994–present, ITV Sport 2015
 Andy Irvine – BBC Radio 5 Live 1992–2004
 Ben Kay – ESPN UK 2010–2013, RTÉ Sport 2011–2015, BT Sport 2013–present, ITV Sport 2015–present
 Thierry Lacroix – France 2 2000–2006, TF1 2007–present, Eurosport 2007–present
 Michael Lynagh – Sky Sports 1998–present, ITV Sport 1999–present, talksport 2013
 Justin Marshall – BBC Sport 2009–2012, Sky Sports NZ 2013–present
 Sir Ian McGeechan – Talksport 2013, Sky Sports 2013, BBC Sport 2014–2015, ITV Sport 2015–present
 Bill McLaren – BBC Radio 1953–1959, BBC Sport 1959–2002
 Ugo Monye – BT Sport 2014–present, ITV Sport 2015–present, BBC Radio 5 Live 2015–present
 Brian Moore – BBC Sport 2002–present, talkSPORT 2011, 2013–present, BBC Radio 5 Live 2015
 Nick Mullins – BBC Radio 5 Live 1995–2010, BBC Sport 1995–2010, ESPN 2010–2013, ITV Sport 2011 & 2015–present, BT Sport 2013–present,
 Geordan Murphy – ITV Sport 2015
 Jim Neilly – BBC Radio 1979–present, BBC Sport 1994–2003 (still commentates for BBC Northern Ireland)
 Andy Nicol – BBC Sport 1998–present, STV 2009, BT Sport 2014–present
 Grant Nisbett – TVNZ 1984–1996, Sky TV (NZ) 1996–present
 Brian O'Driscoll – BT Sport 2014–present, ITV Sport 2015–present
 François Pienaar – ITV Sport 1999–present
 Keith Quinn – TVNZ 1971–2007 (now working as a freelance)
 Ian Robertson – BBC Radio 1972–1980, 1983–present
 Jason Robinson – ITV Sport 2015–present
 Jim Rosenthal – ITV Sport 1997–2007, OSN 2015
 Pierre Salviac – France Télévisions 1983–2005
 Angus Scott – ITV Sport 1997–2007
 Bill Seward – NBC Rugby World Cup 2011
 Nigel Starmer-Smith – BBC Sport 1973–2002, ITV Sport 2003–2006
 John Taylor – ITV Sport 1991–2007, talkSPORT 2005 & 2011–2013
 Gareth Thomas – ITV Sport 2011–present
 Teddy Wakelam – BBC Sport 1927–1939
 Peter West – BBC Sport 1956–1986
 Jonny Wilkinson – Sky Sports 2014–present, ITV Sport 2015–present
 Rhodri Williams – Setanta Sports 2006–2009
 Shane Williams – BBC Sport 2012–present, Talksport 2013, BT Sport 2015–present, ITV Sport 2015–present, Channel 4 2018 – present, Premier Sports 2018–present
 Martyn Williams – BBC Sport 2012–present, BBC Radio 5 Live 2012–present, Channel 4 2018-present, Premier Sports 2018–present
 Keith Wood – BBC Sport 2002–2017, TV3 Ireland 2015
 Sir Clive Woodward – BBC Sport 2013–2015 & 2016, Sky Sports 2013–present, ITV Sport 2015–present

Snooker
 David Bobin - Sky Sports 2000
 Eddie Charlton - BBC Sport 1987-1994
 Matt Chilton – ITV Sport 2011
 Radzi Chinyanganya - BBC Sport, ITV Sport, Matchroom Sport 2020, Eurosport 2021
 Dominic Dale – BBC Sport 2004–2005, BBC Wales, Eurosport/Quest 2016–present, ITV Sport 2020
 Abigail Davies - BBC Sport 2022
 Steve Davis – ITV Sport 1999–2001, BBC Sport 2001–present
 Ken Doherty – BBC Sport 2007 & 2009–present, ITV Sport 2020, Freesports 2020-, YouTube 2021
 Dougie Donnelly – BBC Sport 1993-2001
 Jill Douglas – ITV Sport 2013–present
 Peter Drury – ITV Sport 1999–2001, 2010, 2013
 Mike Dunn (snooker player) - BBC Sport 2020-
 Peter Ebdon – BBC Sport 2016
 Ray Edmonds – ITV Sport 1988–1992, BBC Sport 1992–2004
 Reanne Evans - BBC Sport 2019- Eurosport 2019-
 Clive Everton – BBC Radio 1972–1978, BBC Sport 1978–2011, ITV Sport 2010, 2013–2019, Sky Sports 2009–2015
 Dave Farrar - BBC Sport 2020
 Jason Ferguson - Sky Sports 2000
 Neal Foulds – Sky Sports 2004–present, Eurosport/Quest 2004–present, BBC Sport 2004–2014, ITV Sport 2013–present
 Andy Goldstein – Sky Sports, Eurosport/Quest 2016–present
 Terry Griffiths – BBC Sport 
 Mike Hallett – BBC Sport 1996, Sky Sports 1999–2015, Eurosport/Quest 2005–2019
 Stephen Hendry – BBC Sport 2011–present, ITV Sport 2016–present
 Alex Higgins - BBC Sport 1984
 Eamonn Holmes – BBC Sport 1990–1992
 David Icke – BBC Sport 1983–1990
 Hazel Irvine – BBC Sport 2001–present
 Seema Jaswal - Eurosport 2017, BBC Sport 2019–present
 Joe Johnson – BBC 2020, Eurosport
 Mark Johnston-Allen - Sky Sports
 Jack Karnehm – BBC Sport 1978–1994
 Peter Lines - BBC Sport 2020, ITV Sport 2020, Eurosport 2020, Freesports 2020
 Ted Lowe – BBC Sport 1946–1996, 1997 (seniors event)
 Des Lynam - BBC Sport 1981-1982
 Alan McManus Eurosport 2017–present, ITV Sport 2013–present, BBC 2017–present
 Jim Meadowcroft – BBC Sport 1984–1987, 1997–2000, ITV Sport
 Jason Mohammad – BBC Sport 2013–2018 & 2020
 Shaun Murphy - BBC Sport 2018, Freesports 2020
 Colin Murray – Eurosport/Quest 2015–present
 Ronnie O'Sullivan – ITV Sport 2010–2011, Eurosport/Quest 2015–present
 John Parrott – BBC Sport 2001–present
 Joe Perry – ITV Sport 2018 & 2020, BBC Sport 2020-
 Rishi Persad BBC 2022, ITV,
 John Pulman – BBC Sport 1979–1982, ITV Sport 1992
 George Riley – BBC Sport 2015–2017 (only at World Snooker Championship)
 Vera Selby - BBC Sport 1982
 Matt Smith – BBC Sport 2000–2001, ITV Sport 2010–2011, 2014, Eurosport 2016–present
 John Spencer – BBC Sport 1978–1998
 Ray Stubbs – BBC Sport 2002–2009
 Dennis Taylor – BBC Sport 1993–present, ITV Sport 1990, 1991, 2011, Eurosport/Quest 2016
 Willie Thorne – BBC Sport 2001–2020, Sky Sports 2001–2013
 David Vine – BBC Sport 1978–2000
 John Virgo – BBC Sport 1985–present
 Rob Walker – BBC Sport 2008–present (Tournament MC and BBC Reporter, Commentator 2016, 2020), ITV Sport 2015–present, YouTube 2016–2019, 2021
 Mike Watterson - Eurosport 1989-, Sky Sports - 1991-1994
 Jimmy White – BBC Sport 2010, Eurosport/Quest 2015–present
 Mark Wildman –  ITV -2000, Eurosport 2002–2004, Sky Sports 2002-2004
 Rex Williams – BBC Sport 1980–1984, ITV Sport 
 Jim Wych – Sky Sports 1990–1997

Squash
 Joey Barrington

Sumo
 Dewanishiki Tadao – NHK 1990–1999
 Kitanofuji Katsuaki – NHK 1998–present
 Mainoumi Shūhei – NHK 2000–present
 Wakanohana Masaru – AbemaTV 2019–present

Swimming
 Gerry Collins – ABC (Aus) 1988–present
 Dennis Cometti – Channel Seven 1986–2002, 2007–present, Nine Network 2002–2007
 Sharron Davies – BBC Sport 1996–present
 Rowdy Gaines – NBC 1996–present
 Anthony Hudson – Network Ten 2009–2011
 Andy Jameson – BBC Sport 1989–present
 Peter Jones – BBC Radio 1968–1988
 Nicole Livingstone – Nine Network 1996–2008, Network Ten 2009–present
 Bruce McAvaney – Seven Network 1980–1983, 1989–present, Network Ten 1983–1989
 Adrian Moorhouse – BBC Sport 1998–present
 James Parrack – Eurosport 2001–present
 Stephen Quartermain – Network Ten 2012
 Mark Tewksbury – CBC
 Ray Warren – Nine Network 1990–2012

Tennis
 Lucie Ahl – Eurosport 2005-2012
 John Alexander OAM – Channel Seven 1987–2010, BBC Sport 1990-2005
 Vassos Alexander – BBC Radio 2003, 2012-2018
 Rex Alston – BBC Radio 1946-1960
 Vijay Amritraj – Star Sports 1993–2017, BBC Sport 1999-present, Fox Sports
 Julie Anthony – CBS 1976-1984
 Arthur Ashe – CBS 1976, ABC Sports 1980–1992, HBO 1981-1992
 Tracy Austin – CBS 1991–present, BBC Sport 2003–present, Seven Network 2006–2019
 Richard Bacon – BBC Radio 2010-2012
 Chris Bailey – Sky Sports 1995–2007, BBC Sport 1995–2010
 Clare Balding – BBC Radio 5 Live 1995–2012, 2014–present, BBC Sport 2015–present
 Sue Barker – Channel Seven 1985–1989, BSB 1990 (BSB merged with Sky November 1990), Sky Sports 1991–1993, BBC Sport 1993–present
 John Barrett – BBC Sport 1971–2006, Channel Nine 1980–1986, Channel Seven 1987–2007, USA Network 1988–1989, BSB 1990 (BSB merged with Sky November 1990), Sky Sports 1991, Tennis Channel 2003–2006
 Marion Bartoli – ITV Sport 2015–present, BBC Sport 2014–2015, BBC Radio 2014–present
 Jeremy Bates – BBC Radio 2012–present
 Boris Becker – BBC Sport 1998 (1 match), 2002–2013 & 2017–present, Sky Sports 2011–2013
 Nick Bollettieri – BBC Radio 2012-2016
 Björn Borg – BBC Sport 1983, NBC 1983
 Don Budge – NBC 1953-1960
 Elise Burgin – USA network 1992-?, Sky Sports c.1999-c.2006
 Darren Cahill – ESPN 2007–present
 Mary Carillo – USA Network 1980–1987, PBS 1981–1986, CBS 1986–present, ESPN 1988–1997, 2003–, HBO 1996–1999, NBC 1996–present
 Harry Carpenter – BBC Sport 1967–1993
 Pat Cash – BBC Sport 1997–present, BBC Radio 5 Live 2004–present
 Andrew Castle – Sky Sports 1992–2000, 2011–2018, BBC Sport 2002–present, Eurosport 2011–present, BBC Radio 2021
 Gillian Clark – BBC Sport 1999, Eurosport
 Kim Clijsters – BBC Radio 2018–present
 David Coleman – BBC Sport 1960-1969
 Bud Collins – NBC 1964, 1972–2007, CBS 1968–1972, ESPN 2007–2009, Tennis Channel 2007-2009
 Jimmy Connors – NBC 1990–1991, BBC Sport 2005–2007, 2014, Tennis Channel 2009–present, Amazon Prime 2018
 Andrew Cotter – BBC Sport 2008–present
 Jim Courier – CBS 2003–present, Seven Network 2005–2018, ITV Sport 2012–present, BBC Sport 2016–present, Channel Nine 2019-present
 Barry Cowan – Sky Sports 2002–2018
 Mark Cox – BBC Sport 1977-2015
 Annabel Croft – BBC Sport 2002–2010 & 2014–present, BBC Radio 5 Live 2000–present, Sky Sports 2007–2018, Eurosport 1999–present, ITV Sport 2010–present
 Rob Curling - Eurosport 2009–present
 Jason Dasey – ESPN Star Sports 2003–2005, ASTRO 2009–present
 Lindsay Davenport – BBC Sport 2010–2016, ITV Sport 2013–2016
 Barry Davies – BBC Sport 1979, 1981–2018
 Donald Dell – Channel Seven 1978–1981, NBC 1979-1983
 Chris Dittmar – Seven Network 2005–2019
 Cliff Drysdale – CBS 1977, ESPN 1979–present (ABC Sports), Channel Four 1988
 Jo Durie – Eurosport 1995–present, BBC Sport 1995–present
 Maurice Edelston – BBC Radio 1961-1975
 Dick Enberg – NBC 1978–2000, CBS 2000–2011, 2014, ESPN 2004–2016
 Chris Evert – NBC 1990–2003, BBC Sport 2002, ESPN 2011–present
 David Felgate – BBC Radio 2001–2002, 2010–present
 Mary Joe Fernández – ESPN, CBS 2005–present
 Peter Fleming – Sky Sports 1995–2018, BBC Sport 1999-present, Eurosport
 Ken Fletcher – BBC Sport 1978
 Keith Fordyce – BBC Sport 1967-1968
 Chris Fowler – ESPN 2004–present
 Neale Fraser – BBC Sport 1980, 1999 (1 match)
 Russell Fuller – BBC Radio 2001–present
 Vitas Gerulaitis – CBS, USA 1988–1994
 Brad Gilbert – BBC Radio 2002, ESPN 2004–present
 Raymond Glendenning – BBC Radio 1945–1963, BBC Sport 1950-1951
 Jason Goodall – Eurosport 2002–present, BBC Radio 2003, BBC Sport 2004–2014, ESPN 2015–present
 Freddie Grisewood – BBC Sport 1937–1955, BBC Radio 1937-1948
 Tony Gubba – BBC Sport 1980
 Brett Haber  – ESPN 1994–1998; Tennis Channel 2003-Present
 Miles Harrison – BBC Radio 1993–1996, Sky Sports 1995
 Tim Henman – BBC Sport 2008–present
 Lleyton Hewitt – BBC Sport 2016, Seven Network 2010–18, Nine Network 2019–present
 Celina Hinchcliffe – BBC Sport 2005–2011, 2017–2018, ITV Sport 2012–present
 Lynsey Hipgrave – BT Sport 2013–present
 Eamonn Holmes – BBC Sport 1992
 Bob Howe – BBC Radio 1972-1988
 Anthony Hudson – Seven Network 2001
 Joyce Hume – BBC Radio 1982-1998
 Paul Hutchins – BBC Sport 1986-1995
 David Icke – BBC Sport 1987
 Mike Ingham – BBC Radio 1982-1989
 John Inverdale – BBC Radio 1987–2001, 2013, BBC Sport 1998, 2000–present, ITV Sport 2011–present
 Goran Ivanišević – BBC Radio 2013–present
 Luke Jensen – ESPN 1994–present, BBC Radio 1998–2001, Tennis Channel
 Ann Jones – BBC Sport 1970–2005, CBS 1971-1972
 Charlie Jones– NBC 1983-1992
 Peter Jones – BBC Radio 1975-1988
 Phil Jones – BBC Sport 1994, 2003-2017
 Anne Keothavong – BBC Sport 2013–present, BT Sport 2013–present, ITV Sport 2019–present
 Billie Jean King – ABC Sports 1976-?, CBS 1978, NBC 1979-, HBO 1984–1999, Channel Four 1988
 Billy Knight – BBC Sport 1968-1976
 Robbie Koenig – Various
 Richard Krajicek – BBC Radio 2012-2016
 Jack Kramer – NBC 1954–1962, BBC Sport 1960–1973, 1976 & 1996 (1 match), ABC 1965–1973, CBS 1968-1973
 Jim Lampley – HBO 1988-1999
 Peter Landy – Channel Seven 1978-1999
 David Law – BBC Radio 5 Live 2002–present, BT Sport 2013-
 Tony Livesey – BBC Radio 2017–present
 David Lloyd – BBC Radio 1979-2004
 John Lloyd – HBO 1993–1999, BBC Sport 2000–present, BBC Radio 2004–2005, ITV Sport 2009–2011
 Colin Long – Channel Seven 1973-1977
 Des Lynam – BBC Sport 1981–1999, BBC Radio 1978–1981, BBC Radio 5 Live 2005
 Bill Macatee – USA Network 1990–1994, CBS 1995–2014, Tennis Channel
 Barry Mackay – HBO 1983–1999, USA Network 1984–2008, Fox Sports, Tennis Channel 2003-2011
 Miles Maclagan – BBC Radio 2015–present
 Dan Maskell – BBC Radio 1949–1951, BBC Sport 1951–1991
 Wally Masur – Sky Sports 1996–1999, Channel Seven 1998–1999, etc.
 Simon Mayo – BBC Radio 5 Live 2003–2009
 Bruce McAvaney – Channel Seven 1990-2016
 John McEnroe – NBC (USA network) 1991–2012, CBS 1991–present, Eurosport 1997, 2015–present, BBC Sport 2000–present, ESPN 2005, 2009–present, Channel Nine 2019–present
 Patrick McEnroe – ESPN 1995–present, CBS 1997–present
 Hamish McLachlan – Seven Network 2008-18
 Frew McMillan – BBC Radio 1984–2014, Sky Sports 1991–1996, Eurosport 1992–present
 Peter McNamara – BBC Radio 1995-2001
 David Mercer – BBC Radio 1984–1992, BBC Sport 1992–2020, Eurosport 1992–2014, USA Network 1995, Sky Sports 1996, BT Sport 2013–2020
 John Motson – BBC Sport 1973, BBC Radio 1976-1981
 Tony Mottram – BBC Radio 1961-1968
 Nick Mullins – BBC Radio 2001–present, BBC Sport 2012–present, ITV Sport 2012–present, BT Sport 2013–present
 Andy Murray – BBC Sport 2018 (1 match)
 Brent Musburger – CBS 1976-1989
 Jim Nantz – CBS 1987-1995
 Martina Navratilova – HBO 1995–1999, BBC Sport 1999-present (not all years)
 John Newcombe – Channel Seven 1977, NBC 1977–1978, CBS 1978–1987, Channel Nine
 Jana Novotna – BBC Sport 2000–2001, BBC Radio 2008-2017
 Pat O'Brien – CBS 1981–1997, 2006
 Eleanor Oldroyd – BBC Radio 2010-2018
 Jonathan Overend – BBC Radio 5 Live 1999–2013, BBC Sport 2011–present
 Bud Palmer – NBC 1953-1959
 Fred Perry – BBC Sport 1951–1952, ITV Sport 1956–1968, BBC Radio 1959-1994
 Mark Petchey – BBC Sport 1999–present, Sky Sports 1999–2018, Eurosport 2000–present, ITV Sport 2012–present
 Mary Pierce – BBC Radio 2014-2017
 Louise Pleming – ABC 1998–2016, ESPN Star 2004–2014, BBC Sport 2005–present, Fox Sports 2000–2010, Tennis Channel 2008–2010, 2015–present, Channel Seven 2015
 Barbara Potter – BBC Radio 1989–1996, Sky Sports 1995-c.1998
 Garry Richardson – BBC Sport 1995-2016
 Steve Rider – BBC Sport 1985–1986, 1998
 Max Robertson – ABC (Aus) 1937–1939, BBC Radio 1946–1986
 Ted Robinson – NBC (inc. USA network) 1987–present, Tennis Channel 2007–present
 Laura Robson – BBC Radio 2014–present
 Andy Roddick – BBC Sport 2015
 Helen Rollason – BBC Sport 1990-1992
 Chanda Rubin – BBC Sport & BBC Radio 2018–present
 Greg Rusedski – Eurosport 2007–present, BBC Sport 2007–2012, Sky Sports 2008–2018
 Tim Ryan – CBS 1978-1997
 Fabrice Santoro – ITV Sport 2012–present
 Barbara Schett - Eurosport 2010–present, BBC Radio 2012-present
 Frank Sedgman – Various Australian TV channels 1960-1976
 Leif Shiras – Sky Sports 2002–2018
 Pam Shriver – CBS 1997–, BBC Sport 1990–2011, Channel Seven 1995–2001, HBO 1999, ESPN 2000–present
 Jim Simpson – ABC 1964, NBC 1965-1978
 Leon Smith – BBC Radio 2015–present
 Samantha Smith BBC Sport 2002–present, ITV Sport 2012–present, BT Sport 2013–present
 Stan Smith – NBC 1984-1992
 Liz Smylie – BBC Sport 2005–present
 Jeff Stelling – BBC Radio 1985-1988
 Michael Stich – BBC Radio 5 Live 2000–2012, BBC Sport 1999 (1 match), 2003–2012
 Fred Stolle – Channel Nine 1979–present, ESPN, Fox Sports
 Allan Stone – Channel Seven 1978–2015, Tennis Channel
 Pat Summerall – CBS 1972-1993
 Bill Talbert – NBC 1959-1971
 Jeff Tarango – BBC Radio 5 Live 2007–present, ITV Sport 2011
 Georgie Thompson – Sky Sports 2004-c.2011
 Barry Tompkins – HBO 1980–1987, Tennis Channel
 Tony Trabert – CBS 1972–2003, Nine Network 1985–2004
 Christine Truman – BBC Radio 1975–2006
 Wendy Turnbull – Channel Seven 1988–1997, BBC Radio 1997-2004
 David Vine – BBC Sport 1967–1982
 Virginia Wade – CBS 1977–1985, BBC Sport 1981–2015, USA Network 1993-1996
 Teddy Wakelam – BBC Radio 1927-1939
 Peter West – BBC Sport 1953–1982
 Mats Wilander – Eurosport 2006–present, BBC Radio 2017-present
 Chris Wilkinson – Eurosport 2005–present, ITV Sport 2012-2014
 Gerald Williams – BBC Radio 1975–1983, BBC Sport 1981–1989, BSB 1990 (BSB merged with Sky November 1990), Sky Sports 1991-2001
 Michael Williamson – Channel Seven 1973-1977
 Todd Woodbridge – Channel Seven 2006–2018, BBC Radio 2006–2010, Channel Nine 2018–present, BBC Sport 2019-present
 Mark Woodforde – Channel Nine 2002–2010, ESPN 2010–present, BBC Radio 2011–present, Fox Sports
 Basil Zempilas – Channel Seven 2008-2018

Miscellaneous
 John Anderson – ESPN 1999–present, Talksport 2009–present
 Chris Berman – ESPN 1979–present, ABC (US) 1996–present
 Eric Bischoff – WCW 1991–1996
 Frank Bough – BBC Sport 1964–1982, ITV Sport 1991
 James Brown – CBS 1985–1993, Fox 1994–2006, CBS 2006–present
 Tiffany Cherry – Fox Footy 2002–2006 ESPN 2007 –present
 Matt Chilton – Eurosport 1992–present, BBC Sport 1995–present, ITV Sport 2011
 Jonathan Coachman – WWE 1999–2008, ESPN 2009–present
 Linda Cohn – ESPN 1992–present
 Michael Cole – WWE 1997–present
 Bob Costas – NBC 1980–present
 Jason Dasey – Sky News 1989–1991, BBC World 1994–1997, CNN 1999–2001, ESPN Star Sports 2001–2006, ESPN 2006–2009, ASTRO 2009–present
 Dickie Davies – ITV Sport 1965–1989, Eurosport 1991
 Rece Davis – ESPN 1995–present
 Anne Doyle – WJBK (CBS-TV in Detroit) 1978–1983, and pioneering female sports broadcaster in the U.S.
 Rich Eisen – ESPN 1996–2003, NFL Network 2003–present
 Dick Enberg – NBC 1975–2000, CBS 2000–present
 Marty Glickman
 Greg Gumbel – ESPN 1979–1988, CBS 1988–1993, NBC 1994–1997, CBS 1998–present
 Tom Hammond – NBC 1984–present
 Gary Imlach – Channel 4 1990–2001, 2010, ITV Sport 2002–present
 John Inverdale – BBC Radio 1986–present, Sky Sports 1990–1991, BBC Sport 1994–present, ITV Sport 2011–present 
 Hazel Irvine – ITV Sport 1987–1990, BBC Sport 1990–present
 Ernie Johnson, Jr. – Turner Sports 1989–present
 Jim Lampley – ABC (US) 1974–1987, CBS 1987–1992, NBC 1992–
 Jerry "The King" Lawler – WWE 1993–present
 Steve Levy – ESPN 1993–present
 Bob Ley – ESPN 1979–present
 Des Lynam – BBC Radio 1969–1981, 2004–2005, BBC Sport 1977–1999, ITV Sport 1999–2004, Setanta Sports 2007–2009
 Bill Macatee – NBC 1982–1990, CBS 1990–present
 Sean McDonough – CBS 1990–2000, ABC (US) 2000–present
 Jimmy Magee – RTÉ Radio 1 1962–present, RTÉ Sport 1962–present
 Vince McMahon – WWE 1972–1997
 Al Michaels – ABC (US) 1977–2006, NBC 2006–present
 Brent Musburger – CBS 1975–1990, ABC (US) 1990–present
 Jim Nantz – CBS 1985–present, BBC 2010–2012
 Pat O'Brien – CBS 1981–2000, NBC 2000–present
 "Mean Gene" Okerlund – WWE 1984–1993, WCW 1993–2001, WWE 2001–present
 Keith Olbermann – ESPN 1992–1997, 2013–present, Fox Sports Net 1998–2001, NBC 2007–2010
 Eleanor Oldroyd – BBC Radio 5 Live 1994–present
 Nick Owen – ITV Sport 1986–1992
 Dan Patrick – ESPN 1989–2007, NBC 2008–present
 Ian Payne – BBC Radio 1988–2003, Sky Sports 2003–2010, LBC 2010–present, BBC Radio 2010–present, ITV News 2013–present
 Mark Pougatch – BBC Radio 5 Live 1994–present, BBC Sport 2004–2005, ITV Sport 2012–present, Channel 5 2011–present
 Sam Quek - BBC 2021
 Steve Rider – ITV 1980–1985, 2006–present, BBC Sport 1985–2005, Sky Sports 2012–present
 Sandy Roberts – Seven Network 1980–present
 Jim Rosenthal – BBC Radio 1977–1980, ITV Sport 1980–2011, Channel 5 2010–2012, Boxnation 2011–present
 Jim Ross – WWE 1993–2013,  2017-19 AEW All Elite Wrestling 2019–present
 Mark Saggers – BBC Radio 1989–1992, Sky Sports 1992–2001, BBC Radio 5 Live 2001–2009, talkSport 2009–present
 John Saunders – 1986–present
 Chris Schenkel – DuMont 1952–1956, CBS 1956–1965, ABC 1965–1997
 Tony Schiavone – WWE 1989–1990, WCW 1991–2001 AEW All Elite Wrestling 2019–present
 Stuart Scott – ESPN 1993–2015
 Dan Shulman – TSN 1995–2007, ESPN 2001–present
 Jimmy Smith – WWE 2021–present 
 Hannah Storm – CNN 1989–1992, NBC 1992–2002, ESPN 2008–present
 Joey Styles – ECW 1993–2001, WWE 2005–2008
 Tazz – WWE 2000–2009, TNA 2009–2015 AEW All Elite Wrestling 2019–present 
 Mike Tenay – WCW 1994–2001, TNA 2002–present
 Joe Tessitore — ESPN 2002–present
 Mike Tirico – ESPN 1991–present, ABC (US) 1996–present
 Scott Van Pelt – The Golf Channel 1994–2000, ESPN 2001–present
 Whit Watson – ESPN 1997–2003, Sun Sports 2003–present
 Alan Weeks – BBC Sport 1952–1996
 Don West – TNA 2002–2009
 Jeanne Zelasko – Fox Sports Net 1996–2001, Fox 2001–2008

See also
 Broadcasting of sports events

References

Lists of sports announcers
Lists of sportspeople
Lists of entertainers